This is a complete list of all 1,872 Statutory Instruments published in the United Kingdom in the year 1995.

1-100

 National Health Service (Optical Charges and Payments) (Scotland) Amendment Regulations 1995 (S.I. 1995/1)
 Plymouth Hospitals National Health Service Trust (Transfer of Trust Property) Order 1995 (S.I. 1995/2)
 Chester—Bangor Trunk Road (A55) (Aber Improvement) Detrunking Order 1995 (S.I. 1995/5)
 Criminal Justice Act 1988 (Reviews of Sentencing) Order 1995 (S.I. 1995/10)
 Pigs (Records, Identification and Movement) Order 1995 (S.I. 1995/11)
 Bovine Animals (Records, Identification and Movement) Order 1995 (S.I. 1995/12)
 Enzootic Bovine LeUkosis (Amendment) Order 1995 (S.I. 1995/13)
 Beef Special Premium (Amendment) Regulations 1995 (S.I. 1995/14)
 Suckler Cow Premium (Amendment) Regulations 1995 (S.I. 1995/15)
 Fertilisers (Amendment) Regulations 1995 (S.I. 1995/16)
 A23 Trunk Road (Brighton Road, Croydon) (Prohibition of Right Turn and U-Turn) Order 1995 (S.I. 1995/17)
 Community Charges (Administration and Enforcement) (Amendment) Regulations 1995 (S.I. 1995/21)
 Council Tax (Administration and Enforcement) (Amendment) Regulations 1995 (S.I. 1995/22)
 Local Government Changes for England (Council Tax and Non-Domestic Rating, Demand Notices) Regulations 1995 (S.I. 1995/23)
 Criminal Justice and Public Order Act 1994 (Commencement No. 4) Order 1995 (S.I. 1995/24)
 Industrial Training Levy (Construction Board) Order 1995 (S.I. 1995/25)
 Industrial Training Levy (Engineering Construction Board) Order 1995 (S.I. 1995/26)
 Employment Protection (Part-time Employees) Regulations 1995 (S.I. 1995/31)
 Borough of Trafford (Eastern Spine Canal Bridge) Scheme 1993 Confirmation Instrument 1995 (S.I. 1995/33)
 National Health Service (Optical Charges and Payments) Amendment Regulations 1995 (S.I. 1995/34)
 Occupational and Personal Pension Schemes (Miscellaneous Amendments) Regulations 1995 (S.I. 1995/35)
 Borough of Trafford (A5063 Trafford Road/White City Gyratory System Canal Bridges) Scheme 1993 Confirmation Instrument 1995 (S.I. 1995/38)
 Food Protection (Emergency Prohibitions) (Radioactivity in Sheep) (England) (Partial Revocation) Order 1995 (S.I. 1995/39)
 Apple Orchard Grubbing Up (Amendment) Regulations 1995 (S.I. 1995/40)
 Justices of the Peace Act 1949 (Compensation) (Variation) Regulations 1995 (S.I. 1995/41)
 Police and Magistrates' Courts Act 1994 (Commencement No. 6 and Transitional Provisions) Order 1995 (S.I. 1995/42)
 Criminal Justice Act 1993 (Commencement No. 8) Order 1995 (S.I. 1995/43)
 District of Bromsgrove (Electoral Arrangements) Order 1995 (S.I. 1995/44)
 Education (Special Educational Needs) (Prescribed Forms) (Welsh Forms) Regulations 1995 (S.I. 1995/45)
 Food Protection (Emergency Prohibitions) (Radioactivity in Sheep) (Wales) (Partial Revocation) Order 1995 (S.I. 1995/46)
 Food Protection (Emergency Prohibitions) (Radioactivity in Sheep) Partial Revocation Order 1995 (S.I. 1995/48)
 Home Energy Efficiency Grants (Amendment) Regulations 1995 (S.I. 1995/49)
 Education (National Curriculum) (Attainment Targets and Programmes of Study in English) Order 1995 (S.I. 1995/51)
 Education (National Curriculum) (Attainment Targets and Programmes of Study in Mathematics) Order 1995 (S.I. 1995/52)
 Education (National Curriculum) (Attainment Targets and Programmes of Study in Science) Order 1995 (S.I. 1995/53)
 Education (National Curriculum) (Attainment Targets and Programmes of Study in History) (England) Order 1995 (S.I. 1995/54)
 Education (National Curriculum) (Attainment Targets and Programmes of Study in Geography) (England) Order 1995 (S.I. 1995/55)
 Education (National Curriculum) (Attainment Targets and Programmes of Study in Technology) Order 1995 (S.I. 1995/56)
 Education (National Curriculum) (Attainment Targets and Programmes of Study in Modern Foreign Languages) Order 1995 (S.I. 1995/57)
 Education (National Curriculum) (Attainment Targets and Programmes of Study in Art) (England) Order 1995 (S.I. 1995/58)
 Education (National Curriculum) (Attainment Targets and Programmes of Study in Music) (England) Order 1995 (S.I. 1995/59)
 Education (National Curriculum) (Attainment Targets and Programmes of Study in Physical Education) Order 1995 (S.I. 1995/60)
 Education (Schools Conducted by Education Associations) (Amendment) Regulations 1995 (S.I. 1995/61)
 Electricity (Non–Fossil Fuel Sources) (England and Wales) (Amendment) Order 1995 (S.I. 1995/68)
 Education (National Curriculum) (Attainment Targets and Programmes of Study in Welsh) Order 1995 (S.I. 1995/69)
 Education (National Curriculum) (Attainment Targest and Programmes of Study in Music) (Wales) Order 1995 (S.I. 1995/70)
 Education (National Curriculum) (Attainment Targets and Programmes of Study in Art) (Wales) Order 1995 (S.I. 1995/71)
 Education (National Curriculum) (Attainment Targets and Programmes of Study in Geography) (Wales) Order 1995 (S.I. 1995/72)
 Education (National Curriculum) (Attainment Targest and Programmes of Study in History) (Wales) Order 1995 (S.I. 1995/73)
 Social Security (Widow's Benefit and Retirement Pensions) Amendment Regulations 1995 (S.I. 1995/74)
 Infant Formula and Follow–on Formula Regulations 1995 (S.I. 1995/77)
 Hartlepools Water Company (Constitution and Regulation) Order 1995 (S.I. 1995/79)
 National Health Service (General Medical Services) Amendment Regulations 1995 (S.I. 1995/80)
 City Hospitals Sunderland National Health Service Trust (Transfer of Trust Property) Order 1995 (S.I. 1995/82)
 Derbyshire Royal Infirmary National Health Service Trust (Transfer of Trust Property) Order 1995 (S.I. 1995/83)
 North Tyneside Health Care National Health Service Trust (Transfer of Trust Property) Order 1995 (S.I. 1995/84)
 Southport and Formby Community Health Services National Health Service Trust (Transfer of Trust Property) Order 1995 (S.I. 1995/85)
 West Lancashire National Health Service Trust (Transfer of Trust Property) Order 1995 (S.I. 1995/86)
 Wrightington Hospital National Health Service Trust (Transfer of Trust Property) Order 1995 (S.I. 1995/87)
 Princess Royal Hospital National Health Service Trust (Establishment) Amendment Order 1995 (S.I. 1995/88)
 Priority Healthcare Wearside National Health Service Trust (Transfer of Trust Property) Order 1995 (S.I. 1995/89)
 Pilgrim Health National Health Service Trust (Transfer of Trust Property) Order 1995 (S.I. 1995/90)
 Royal Hull Hospital National Health Service Trust (Establishment) Amendment Order 1995 (S.I. 1995/91)
 Cumbria Ambulance Service National Health Service Trust (Establishment) Amendment Order 1995 (S.I. 1995/92)
 Teddington Memorial Hospital National Health Service Trust (Establishment) Amendment Order 1995 (S.I. 1995/99)
 Hill Livestock (Compensatory Allowances) (Amendment) Regulations 1995 (S.I. 1995/100)

101-200

 Residuary Body for Wales (Capital Finance) Regulations 1995 (S.I. 1995/101)
 Residuary Body for Wales (Miscellaneous Provisions) Order 1995 (S.I. 1995/102)
 Residuary Body for Wales (Appointed Day) Order 1995 (S.I. 1995/103)
 Local Government Reorganisation (Wales) (Consequential Amendments) Order 1995 (S.I. 1995/115)
 North Hampshire Hospitals National Health Service Trust (Establishment) Amendment Order 1995 (S.I. 1995/117)
 Council Tax and Non-Domestic Rating (Demand Notices) (England) Amendment Regulations 1995 (S.I. 1995/121)
 Gaming (Bingo) Act (Variation of Monetary Limit) Order 1995 (S.I. 1995/122)
 Child Support (Miscellaneous Amendments) Regulations 1995 (S.I. 1995/123)
 A205 Trunk Road (Richmond and Wandsworth) Red Route Experimental Traffic Order 1995 (S.I. 1995/124)
 A205 Trunk Road (Hounslow) Red Route (Bus Lanes) Experimental Traffic Order 1995 (S.I. 1995/125)
 A205 Trunk Road (Hounslow) Red Route Experimental Traffic Order 1995 (S.I. 1995/126)
 Criminal Justice and Public Order Act 1994 (Commencement No. 5 and Transitional Provisions) Order 1995 (S.I. 1995/127)
 Local Government Reorganisation (Wales) (Special Grant) Order 1995 (S.I. 1995/128)
 Welfare of Animals during Transport (Amendment) Order 1995 (S.I. 1995/131)
 Lyon Court and Office Fees (Variation) Order 1995 (S.I. 1995/132)
 Police (Scotland) Amendment Regulations 1995 (S.I. 1995/137)
 Land Registration Rules 1995 (S.I. 1995/140)
 West Wales Ambulance National Health Service Trust (Establishment) Order 1995 (S.I. 1995/141)
 Cardiff Community Healthcare National Health Service Trust (Establishment) Order 1995 (S.I. 1995/142)
 University Dental Hospital National Health Service Trust (Establishment) Order 1995 (S.I. 1995/143)
 Telecommunications Terminal Equipment (Amendment) Regulations 1995 (S.I. 1995/144)
 Law of Property (Miscellaneous Provisions) Act 1994 (Commencement No. 1) Order 1995 (S.I. 1995/145)
 Financial Assistance for Environmental Purposes Order 1995 (S.I. 1995/150)
 Returning Officers (Principal Areas: Wales) Order 1995 (S.I. 1995/151)
 Value Added Tax (General) (Amendment) Regulations 1995 (S.I. 1995/152)
 Merchant Shipping (Hours of Work) Regulations 1995 (S.I. 1995/157)
 Motorways Traffic (England and Wales) (Amendment) Regulations 1995 (S.I. 1995/158)
 Coal Industry Act 1994 (Commencement No. 4) Order 1995 (S.I. 1995/159)
 Council Tax (Demand Notices) (Wales) (Amendment) Regulations 1995 (S.I. 1995/160)
 Local Government Finance (Miscellaneous Provisions) (England) Order 1995 (S.I. 1995/161)
 Legal Aid Advisory Committee (Dissolution) Order 1995 (S.I. 1995/162)
 Valuation Timetable (Scotland) Order 1995 (S.I. 1995/164)
 National Health Service (General Medical and Pharmaceutical Services) (Scotland) Amendment Regulations 1995 (S.I. 1995/165)
 Mackerel (Specified Sea Areas) (Prohibition of Fishing) Order 1995 (S.I. 1995/168)
 Friendly Societies (Taxation of Transfers of Business) Regulations 1995 (S.I. 1995/171)
 Education (Financial Delegation to Schools) (Mandatory Exceptions) Regulations 1995 (S.I. 1995/178)
 Public Telecommunication System Designation (AT&T Communications (UK) LTD) Order 1995 (S.I. 1995/182)
 Education (Welsh Agricultural College Higher Education Corporation) (Dissolution) Order 1995 (S.I. 1995/183)
 Surplus Food Regulations 1995 (S.I. 1995/184)
 Public Service Vehicles (Lost Property) (Amendment) Regulations 1995 (S.I. 1995/185)
 Public Service Vehicles (Conduct of Drivers, Inspectors, Conductors and Passengers) (Amendment) Regulations 1995 (S.I. 1995/186)
 Cleveland (Structural Change) Order 1995 (S.I. 1995/187)
 Housing Revenue Account General Fund Contribution Limits (Scotland) Order 1995 (S.I. 1995/188)
 Environmentally Sensitive Areas (North Peak) Designation (Amendment) Order 1995 (S.I. 1995/189)
 Environmentally Sensitive Areas (Clun) Designation (Amendment) Order 1995 (S.I. 1995/190)
 Environmentally Sensitive Areas (Test Valley) Designation (Amendment) Order 1995 (S.I. 1995/191)
 Environmentally Sensitive Areas (South West Peak) Designation (Amendment) Order 1995 (S.I. 1995/192)
 Environmentally Sensitive Areas (Lake District) Designation (Amendment) Order 1995 (S.I. 1995/193)
 Environmentally Sensitive Areas (Suffolk River Valleys) Designation (Amendment) Order 1995 (S.I. 1995/194)
 Environmentally Sensitive Areas (Exmoor) Designation (Amendment) Order 1995 (S.I. 1995/195)
 Environmentally Sensitive Areas (South Wessex Downs) Designation (Amendment) Order 1995 (S.I. 1995/196)
 Environmentally Sensitive Areas (Avon Valley) Designation (Amendment) Order 1995 (S.I. 1995/197)
 Environmentally Sensitive Areas (Breckland) Designation (Amendment) Order 1995 (S.I. 1995/198)
 Environmentally Sensitive Areas (North Kent Marshes) Designation (Amendment) Order 1995 (S.I. 1995/199)
 Environmentally Sensitive Areas (Cotswold Hills) Designation (Amendment) Order 1995 (S.I. 1995/200)

201-300

 Public Supply Contracts Regulations 1995 (S.I. 1995/201)
 Financial Services Act 1986 (Miscellaneous Exemptions) Order 1995 (S.I. 1995/202)
 A11 Trunk Road (Thetford Bypass Slip Roads) (Trunking) Order 1995 (S.I. 1995/203)
 Toys (Safety) Regulations 1995 (S.I. 1995/204)
 High Court and County Courts Jurisdiction (Amendment) Order 1995 (S.I. 1995/205)
 County Court Remedies (Amendment) Regulations 1995 (S.I. 1995/206)
 Veterinary Surgeons and Veterinary Practitioners (Registration) (Amendment) Regulations Order of Council 1995 (S.I. 1995/207)
 Education (School Financial Statements) (Prescribed Particulars etc.) Regulations 1995 (S.I. 1995/208)
 Council Tax (Transitional Reduction Scheme) (England) Regulations 1995 (S.I. 1995/209)
 Mortgage Indemnities (Recognised Bodies) Order 1995 (S.I. 1995/210)
 Housing (Right to Buy) (Priority of Charges) Order1995 (S.I. 1995/211)
 Local Government Changes for England (Non-Domestic Rating, Collection and Enforcement and Discretionary Relief) Regulations 1995 (S.I. 1995/212)
 Valuation for Rating (Former Enterprise Zones) Regulations 1995 (S.I. 1995/213)
 Local Government Superannuation (Scotland) Amendment Regulations 1995 (S.I. 1995/214)
 Police Regulations 1995 (S.I. 1995/215)
 Income Tax (Employments) (Amendment) Regulations 1995 (S.I. 1995/216)
 Income Tax (Sub–contractors in the Construction Industry) (Amendment) Regulations 1995 (S.I. 1995/217)
 Cardiff—Glan Conwy Trunk Road (A470) (Cancoed to Minffordd Improvement) Order 1995 (S.I. 1995/219)
 Chester—Bangor Trunk Road (A55) (Aber Improvement) Detrunking Order 1995 (S.I. 1995/220)
 Leeds City Council (M1—A1 Link Road/East Leeds Radial (A63) Junction Connecting Roads) Scheme 1993 Confirmation Instrument 1995 (S.I. 1995/231)
 Telecommunications (Registers) Order 1995 (S.I. 1995/232)
 Local Authorities (Alteration of Requisite Calculations and Funds) Regulations 1995 (S.I. 1995/234)
 Billing Authorities (Anticipation of Precepts) (Amendment) Regulations 1995 (S.I. 1995/235)
 Fruit Juices and Fruit Nectars (England, Wales and Scotland) (Amendment) Regulations 1995 (S.I. 1995/236)
 Overseas Service (Pensions Supplement) Regulations 1995 (S.I. 1995/238)
 Non-Domestic Rating (Telecommunications and Canals) (Scotland) Order 1995 (S.I. 1995/239)
 Environmentally Sensitive Areas Designation (Wales) (Amendment) Order 1995 (S.I. 1995/242)
 Environmentally Sensitive Areas (Cambrian Mountains) Designation (Amendment) Order 1995 (S.I. 1995/243)
 Wireless Telegraphy (Licence Charges) (Amendment) Regulations 1995 (S.I. 1995/244)
 Police and Magistrates' Courts Act 1994 (Commencement No. 5 and Transitional Provisions) (Amendment) Order 1995 (S.I. 1995/246)
 Local Government Changes for England (Community Charge and Council Tax, Administration and Enforcement) Regulations 1995 (S.I. 1995/247)
 Land Registration (Scotland) Amendment Rules 1995 (S.I. 1995/248)
 Dairy Produce Quotas (Amendment) Regulations 1995 (S.I. 1995/254)
 Coal Industry (Abolition of Domestic Coal Consumers' Council) Order 1995 (S.I. 1995/255)
 Local Land Charges (Amendment) Rules 1995 (S.I. 1995/260)
 Council for the Central Laboratory of the Research Councils Order 1995 (S.I. 1995/261)
 European Communities (Designation) Order 1995 (S.I. 1995/262)
 Health and Safety at Work etc. Act 1974 (Application outside Great Britain) Order 1995 (S.I. 1995/263)
 Child Abduction and Custody (Parties to Conventions) (Amendment) Order 1995 (S.I. 1995/264)
 European Communities (Definition of Treaties) (The Agreement Establishing the World Trade Organisation) Order 1995 (S.I. 1995/265)
 World Trade Organisation (Immunities and Privileges) Order 1995 (S.I. 1995/266)
 Public Health (Ships and Aircraft) (Isle of Man) (Revocation) Order 1995 (S.I. 1995/267)
 Wireless Telegraphy (Isle of Man) Order 1995 (S.I. 1995/268)
 Transfer of Functions (Treasury and Minister for the Civil Service) Order 1995 (S.I. 1995/269)
 Somerset County Council (Bridgwater Northern Distributor Road Bridge) Scheme 1992 Confirmation Instrument 1995 (S.I. 1995/270)
 Dual-Use and Related Goods (Export Control) Regulations 1995 (S.I. 1995/271)
 Coal Industry Act 1994 (Commencement No. 5) Order 1995 (S.I. 1995/273)
 Insolvency of Employer (Excluded Classes) Regulations 1995 (S.I. 1995/278)
 Value Added Tax (Buildings and Land) Order 1995 Approved by the House of Commons S.I. 1995/279)
 Value Added Tax (Construction of Buildings) Order 1995 Approved by the House of Commons S.I. 1995/280)
 Value Added Tax (Input Tax) (Amendment) Order 1995 (S.I. 1995/281)
 Value Added Tax (Land) Order 1995 (S.I. 1995/282)
 Value Added Tax (Projected Buildings) Order 1995 (S.I. 1995/283)
 Non–Domestic Rating (Demand Notices) (Wales) (Amendment) Regulations 1995 (S.I. 1995/284)
 Waste Management Licensing (Amendment etc.) Regulations 1995 (S.I. 1995/288)
 Isle of Wight (Staff Transfer) Order 1995 (S.I. 1995/289)
 Value Added Tax (Payments on Account) (Amendment) Order 1995 Approved by the House of Commons S.I. 1995/291)
 Food Protection (Emergency Prohibitions) (Oil and Chemical Pollution of Fish) (No.2) Order 1993 (Partial Revocation No.4) Order 1995 (S.I. 1995/292)
 A3 Trunk Road (Kingston By-Pass, Kingston upon Thames and Merton) (40 m.p.h. Speed Limit) Order 1995 (S.I. 1995/296)
 Town and Country Planning (Use Classes) (Amendment) Order 1995 (S.I. 1995/297)
 Town and Country Planning General Development (Amendment) Order 1995 (S.I. 1995/298)
 A638 Trunk Road (King Royd Lane, Brackenhill Common, Ackworth to District Boundary, South Elmsall) (Detrunking) Order 1995 (S.I. 1995/299)
 National Health Service Pension Scheme Regulations 1995 (S.I. 1995/300)

301-400

 Brent and Harrow Health Authority (Transfer of Trust Property) Order 1995 (S.I. 1995/301)
 Approved Probation and Bail Hostel Rules 1995 (S.I. 1995/302)
 Genetically Modified Organisms (Deliberate Release) Regulations 1995 (S.I. 1995/304)
 Public Service Vehicles (Conditions of Fitness, Equipment, Use and Certification) (Amendment) Regulations 1995 (S.I. 1995/305)
 Scottish Land Court (Fees) Order 1995 (S.I. 1995/307)
 Lands Tribunal for Scotland (Amendment) (Fees) Rules 1995 (S.I. 1995/308)
 Medicines (Advisory Board on the Registration of Homoeopathic Products) Order 1995 (S.I. 1995/309)
 Social Security (Incapacity Benefit) (Transitional) Regulations 1995 (S.I. 1995/310)
 Social Security (Incapacity for Work) (General) Regulations 1995 (S.I. 1995/311)
 Non-Domestic Rate (Scotland) Order 1995 (S.I. 1995/312)
 A3 Trunk Road (Malden Way, Kingston upon Thames) (Prescribed Routes) Order 1995 (S.I. 1995/320)
 Gaming Act (Variation of Fees) Order 1995 (S.I. 1995/321)
 Gaming (Bingo) Act (Fees) (Amendment) Order 1995 (S.I. 1995/322)
 Lotteries (Gaming Board Fees) Order 1995 (S.I. 1995/323)
 Nottingham City Hospital National Health Service Trust (Transfer of Trust Property) Order 1995 (S.I. 1995/324)
 A3 Trunk Road (Wandsworth) Red Route (Clearway) Experimental Traffic Order 1995 (S.I. 1995/335)
 A3 Trunk Road (Merton) Red Route Experimental Traffic Order 1995 (S.I. 1995/336)
 A3 Trunk Road (Kingston upon Thames) Red Route (Clearway) Experimental Traffic Order 1995 (S.I. 1995/337)
 A3 Trunk Road (Merton) Red Route (Clearway) Experimental Traffic Order 1995 (S.I. 1995/338)
 A3 Trunk Road (Kingston upon Thames) Red Route Experimental Traffic Order 1995 (S.I. 1995/339)
 Local Government (Compensation for Redundancy or Premature Retirement on Reorganisation) (Scotland) Regulations 1995 (S.I. 1995/340)
 Carlisle Hospitals National Health Service Trust (Transfer of Trust Property) Order 1995 (S.I. 1995/341)
 Guild Community Healthcare National Health Service Trust (Transfer of Trust Property) Order 1995 (S.I. 1995/342)
 Hounslow and Spelthorne Community and Mental Health National Health Service Trust (Transfer of Trust Property) Order 1995 (S.I. 1995/343)
 Lancashire Ambulance Service National Health Service Trust (Transfer of Trust Property) Order 1995 (S.I. 1995/344)
 Preston Acute Hospitals National Health Service Trust (Transfer of Trust Property) Order 1995 (S.I. 1995/345)
 Richmond, Twickenham and Roehampton Healthcare National Health Service Trust (Transfer of Trust Property) Order 1995 (S.I. 1995/346)
 St. Albans and Hemel Hempstead National Health Service Trust (Transfer of Trust Property) Order 1995 (S.I. 1995/347)
 Trafford Healthcare National Health Service Trust (Transfer of Trust Property) Order 1995 (S.I. 1995/348)
 Lloyd's Underwriters (Tax) Regulations 1995 (S.I. 1995/351)
 Lloyd's Underwriters (Tax) (1992–93 to 1996–97) Regulations 1995 (S.I. 1995/352)
 Lloyd's Underwriters (Special Reserve Funds) Regulations 1995 (S.I. 1995/353)
 Milk Development Council Order 1995 (S.I. 1995/356)
 Plastic Materials and Articles in Contact with Food (Amendment) Regulations 1995 (S.I. 1995/360)
 Meat (Hygiene, Inspection and Examinations for Residues) (Charges) Regulations 1995 (S.I. 1995/361)
 Agricultural Processing and Marketing Grant Regulations 1995 (S.I. 1995/362)
 Valuation and Community Charge Tribunals (Amendment) (England) Regulations 1995 (S.I. 1995/363)
 Law Reform (Miscellaneous Provisions) (Scotland) Act 1990 (Commencement No.13) Order 1995 (S.I. 1995/364)
 National Health Service Superannuation Scheme (Scotland) Regulations 1995 (S.I. 1995/365)
 Mines and Quarries (Rateable Values) (Scotland) Order 1995 (S.I. 1995/366)
 Water Undertakings (Rateable Values) (Scotland) Order 1995 (S.I. 1995/367)
 British Gas plc. (Rateable Values) (Scotland) Order 1995 (S.I. 1995/368)
 Electricity Generation Lands (Rateable Values) (Scotland) Order 1995 (S.I. 1995/369)
 Electricity Transmission Lands (Rateable Values) (Scotland) Order 1995 (S.I. 1995/370)
 Electricity Generators (Rateable Values) (Scotland) Order 1995 (S.I. 1995/371)
 Electricity Generators (Aluminium) (Rateable Values) (Scotland) Order 1995 (S.I. 1995/372)
 Electricity Distribution Lands (Rateable Values) (Scotland) Order 1995 (S.I. 1995/373)
 Formula Valuation (Revocations) (Scotland) Order 1995 (S.I. 1995/374)
 Docks and Harbours (Rateable Values) (Scotland) Amendment Order 1995 (S.I. 1995/375)
 Recreation Grounds (Revocation of Parish Council Byelaws) Order 1995 (S.I. 1995/376)
 Land Registration (Implied Covenants for Title) Rules 1995 (S.I. 1995/377)
 Bolton Hospitals National Health ServiceTrust (Transfer of Trust Property) Order 1995 (S.I. 1995/378)
 Burton Hospitals National Health Service Trust (Transfer of Trust Property) Order 1995 (S.I. 1995/379)
 Central Nottinghamshire Healthcare National Health Service Trust (Transfer of Trust Property) Order 1995 (S.I. 1995/380)
 Community Healthcare Bolton National Health Service Trust (Transfer of Trust Property) Order 1995 (S.I. 1995/381)
 East Surrey Learning Disability and Mental Health Service National Health Service Trust (Transfer of Trust Property) Order 1995 (S.I. 1995/382)
 Greenwich Healthcare National Health Service Trust (Transfer of Trust Property) Order 1995 (S.I. 1995/383)
 King's Mill Centre for Health Care Services National Health Service Trust (Transfer of Trust Property) Order 1995 (S.I. 1995/384)
 Lincoln Hospitals National Health Service Trust (Transfer of Trust Property) Order 1995 (S.I. 1995/385)
 Premier Health National Health Service Trust (Transfer of Trust Property) Order 1995 (S.I. 1995/386)
 Surrey Ambulance Service National Health Service Trust (Transfer of Trust Property) Order 1995 (S.I. 1995/387)
 Leeds Development Corporation (Planning Functions) Order 1995 (S.I. 1995/389)
 Leeds Development Corporation (Transfer of Property, Rights and Liabilities) Order 1995 (S.I. 1995/390)
 Local Government Finance (Scotland) Order 1995 (S.I. 1995/391)
 Revenue Support Grant (Scotland) Order 1995 (S.I. 1995/392)
 National Health Service Trusts (Originating Capital Debt) (Wales) Order 1995 (S.I. 1995/394)

401-500

 Local Government Residuary Body (England) Order 1995  S.I. 1995/401)
 Local Government Changes For England (Property Transfer and Transitional Payments) Regulations 1995 (S.I. 1995/402)
 A63 Trunk Road (South Cave Interchange Slip Roads) (Trunking) Order 1995 (S.I. 1995/405)
 A63 Trunk Road (Welton Interchange Slip Roads) (Trunking) Order 1995 (S.I. 1995/406)
 National Health Service Trusts (Originating Capital Debt) Order 1995 (S.I. 1995/407)
 Exchange Gains and Losses (Transitional Provisions) (Amendment) Regulations 1995 (S.I. 1995/408)
 National Health Service (Pharmaceutical Services) (Scotland) Regulations 1995 (S.I. 1995/414)
 Fireworks (Safety) (Revocation) Regulations 1995 (S.I. 1995/415)
 National Health Service (General Medical Services) (Scotland) Regulations 1995 (S.I. 1995/416)
 Town and Country Planning (Environmental Assessment and Permitted Development) Regulations 1995 (S.I. 1995/417)
 Town and Country Planning (General Permitted Development) Order 1995 S.I. 1995/418)
 Town and Country Planning (General Development Procedure) Order 1995 (S.I. 1995/419)
 Bristol City Docks Harbour Revision Order 1995 (S.I. 1995/421)
 Bristol City Docks (No. 2) Harbour Revision Order 1995 (S.I. 1995/422)
 Marriage Act 1994 (Commencement No. 2) Order 1995 (S.I. 1995/424)
 A64 Trunk Road (Bramham Crossroads) Order 1994 (Variation) Order 1995 (S.I. 1995/425)
 M1–A1 Link (Belle Isle To Bramham Crossroads Section And Connecting Roads) Scheme 1994 (Variation) Scheme 1995 (S.I. 1995/426)
 Non-automatic Weighing Machines and Non-automatic Weighing Instruments (Amendment) Regulations 1995 (S.I. 1995/428)
 Railway Pensions (Substitution and Miscellaneous Provisions) Order 1995 (S.I. 1995/430)
 A65 Trunk Road (Chelker Bends Improvement) Order 1995 (S.I. 1995/432)
 A15 (Brigg and Redbourne Bypass) (Trunking) Order 1955 S.I. 1995/433)
 Dual-Use and Related Goods (Export Control) (Suspension) Regulations 1995 (S.I. 1995/441)
 Gaming Licence Duty (Games) Order 1995 (S.I. 1995/442)
 National Assistance (Sums for Personal Requirements) Regulations 1995 (S.I. 1995/443)
 National Health Service (Dental Charges) Amendment Regulations 1995 (S.I. 1995/444)
 Personal Injuries (Civilians) Amendment Scheme 1995 (S.I. 1995/445)
 Income Tax (Employments) (Amendment No. 2) Regulations 1995 (S.I. 1995/447)
 Income Tax (Sub-contractors in the Construction Industry) (Amendment No. 2) Regulations 1995 (S.I. 1995/448)
 Medical Devices (Consultation Requirements) (Fees) Regulations 1995 (S.I. 1995/449)
 Police and Criminal Evidence Act 1984 (Codes of Practice) (No. 3) Order 1995 (S.I. 1995/450)
 Rail Crossing Extinguishment and Diversion Orders, the Public Path Orders and the Definitive Maps and Statements (Amendment) Regulations 1995 (S.I. 1995/451)
 Housing Support Grant (Scotland) Variation Order 1995 (S.I. 1995/469)
 Housing Support Grant (Scotland) Order 1995 (S.I. 1995/470)
 Edinburgh College of Art (Scotland) Order of Council 1995 (S.I. 1995/471)
 Glan Clwyd District General Hospital National Health Service Trust (Transfer of Trust Property) Order 1995 (S.I. 1995/473)
 Gofal Cymuned Clwydian Community Care National Health Service Trust (Transfer of Trust Property) Order 1995 (S.I. 1995/474)
 Wrexham Maelor Hospital National Health Service Trust (Transfer of Trust Property) Order 1995 (S.I. 1995/475)
 Environmental Protection (Waste Recycling Payments) (Amendment) Regulations 1995 (S.I. 1995/476)
 Broadgreen Hospital National Health Service Trust Dissolution Order 1995 (S.I. 1995/477)
 Fosse Health, Leicestershire Community National Health Service Trust Dissolution Order 1995 (S.I. 1995/478)
 Royal Liverpool University Hospital National Health Service Trust Dissolution Order 1995 (S.I. 1995/479)
 St. James's University Hospital National Health Service Trust Dissolution Order 1995 (S.I. 1995/480)
 Weybourne Community National Health Service Trust Dissolution Order 1995 (S.I. 1995/481)
 Disability Working Allowance and Income Support (General) Amendment Regulations 1995 (S.I. 1995/482)
 Certification Officer (Amendment of Fees) Regulations 1995 (S.I. 1995/483)
 Spirit Drinks (Scotland) Amendment Regulations 1995 (S.I. 1995/484)
 A5 Trunk Road (Priorslee—Gailey) (Detrunking) Order 1995 (S.I. 1995/485)
 Antarctic Regulations 1995 (S.I. 1995/490)
 Police and Magistrates' Courts Act 1994 (Commencement No.7 and Transitional Provisions) (Scotland) Order 1995 (S.I. 1995/492)
 Avon (Structural Change) Order 1995 (S.I. 1995/493)
 Offshore Installations (Safety Zones) Order 1995 (S.I. 1995/494)
 Port of Folkestone Licensing (Liquor) Order 1995 (S.I. 1995/495)
 Port of Ramsgate Licensing (Liquor) Order 1995 (S.I. 1995/496)
 Civil Aviation (Navigation Services Charges) Regulations 1995 (S.I. 1995/497)

501-600

 Education (Grants for Education Support and Training) (Wales) Regulations 1995 (S.I. 1995/501)
 Carmarthen and District National Health Service Trust (Transfer of Trust Property) Order 1995 (S.I. 1995/502)
 Derwen National Health Service Trust (Transfer of Trust Property) Order 1995 (S.I. 1995/503)
 Ceredigion and Mid Wales National Health Service Trust (Transfer of Trust Property) Order 1995 (S.I. 1995/504)
 Llanelli Dinefwr National Health Service Trust (Transfer of Trust Property) Order 1995 (S.I. 1995/505)
 Misuse of Drugs (Licence Fees) (Amendment) Regulations 1995 (S.I. 1995/506)
 Coal Industry Act 1994 (British Coal Corporation) Extinguishment of Loans Order 1995 (S.I. 1995/509)
 Marriages (Approved Premises) Regulations 1995 (S.I. 1995/510)
 Housing Benefit and Council Tax Benefit (Amendment) Regulations 1995 (S.I. 1995/511)
 Statutory Sick Pay Percentage Threshold Order 1995 (S.I. 1995/512)
 Statutory Sick Pay Percentage Threshold Order 1995 (Consequential) Regulations 1995 (S.I. 1995/513)
 Social Security (Contributions) Amendment Regulations 1995 (S.I. 1995/514)
 Guaranteed Minimum Pensions Increase Order 1995 (S.I. 1995/515)
 Income-related Benefits Schemes (Miscellaneous Amendments) Regulations 1995 (S.I. 1995/516)
 Local Government Act 1988 (Defined Activities) (Exemption of Development Corporations) (Scotland) Order 1995 (S.I. 1995/517)
 Non-Domestic Rating (Unoccupied Property) (Scotland) Amendment Regulations 1995 (S.I. 1995/518)
 Barking Barrage Order 1995 (S.I. 1995/519)
 Local Government Changes for England (Staff) Regulations 1995 (S.I. 1995/520)
 Value Added Tax Act 1994 (Interest on Tax) (Prescribed Rate) Order 1995 (S.I. 1995/521)
 Education (Individual Pupils' Achievements) (Information) (Wales) (Amendment) Regulations 1995 (S.I. 1995/522)
 Occupational and Personal Pension Schemes (Levy) Regulations 1995 (S.I. 1995/524)
 Merchant Shipping (Light Dues) (Amendment) Regulations 1995 (S.I. 1995/525)
 Plant Breeders' Rights (Herbaceous Perennials) Scheme 1995 (S.I. 1995/526)
 Plant Breeders' Rights (Miscellaneous Ornamental Plants) Scheme 1995 (S.I. 1995/527)
 Plant Breeders' Rights (Trees, Shrubs and Woody Climbers) (Variation) Scheme 1995 (S.I. 1995/528)
 Plant Breeders' Rights (Sweet Peas) Scheme 1995 (S.I. 1995/529)
 Plant Breeders' Rights (Vegetables) (including Field Beans and Field Peas) (Variation) Scheme 1995 (S.I. 1995/530)
 Local Government Changes for England (Housing Benefit and Council Tax Benefit) Regulations 1995 (S.I. 1995/531)
 Education (School Financial Statements) (Prescribed Particulars etc.) (Amendment) Regulations 1995 (S.I. 1995/532)
 National Health Service (Determination of Districts) (No. 2) Order 1995 (S.I. 1995/533)
 National Health Service (District Health Authorities) (No. 2) Order 1995 (S.I. 1995/534)
 Local Authorities (Capital Finance) (Rate of Discount for 1995/96) Regulations 1995 (S.I. 1995/535)
 Greater London and Surrey (County and London Borough Boundaries) (Variation) Order 1995 (S.I. 1995/536)
 Bovine Offal (Prohibition) (Scotland) Amendment Regulations 1995 (S.I. 1995/537)
 Central Regional Council (Prohibition of Swimming, Bathing etc. in Reservoirs) Byelaws Extension Order 1995 (S.I. 1995/538)
 Fresh Meat (Hygiene and Inspection) Regulations 1995 (S.I. 1995/539)
 Poultry Meat, Farmed Game Bird Meat and Rabbit Meat (Hygiene and Inspection) Regulations S.I. 1995/540)
 Medicines (Homoeopathic Medicinal Products for Human Use) Amendment Regulations 1995 (S.I. 1995/541)
 Legal Aid in Criminal and Care Proceedings (General) (Amendment) Regulations 1995 (S.I. 1995/542)
 Education (Grants) (Travellers and Displaced Persons) (Amendment) Regulations 1995 (S.I. 1995/543)
 Local Government (Wales) Act 1994 (Commencement No. 3) Order 1995 (S.I. 1995/546)
 Police (Amendment) Regulations 1995 (S.I. 1995/547)
 Non-Domestic Rates (Levying) (Scotland) Regulations 1995 (S.I. 1995/548)
 Non-Domestic Rating (Unoccupied Property) (Amendment) Regulations 1995 (S.I. 1995/549)
 Building Societies (Liquid Asset) (Amendment) Regulations 1995 (S.I. 1995/550)
 Road Vehicles (Construction and Use) (Amendment) Regulations 1995 (S.I. 1995/551)
 British Citizenship (Designated Service) (Amendment) Order 1995 (S.I. 1995/552)
 Local Authorities (Members' Allowances) (Amendment) Regulations 1995 (S.I. 1995/553)
 Financial Assistance for Environmental Purposes (No. 2) Order 1995 (S.I. 1995/554)
 Prosecution of Offences (Custody Time Limits) (Amendment) Regulations 1995 (S.I. 1995/555)
 Local Government (Promotion of Economic Development) (Amendment) Regulations 1995 (S.I. 1995/556)
 National Health Service (General Ophthalmic Services) Amendment Regulations 1995 (S.I. 1995/558)
 Social Security Benefits Up-rating Order 1995 (S.I. 1995/559)
 Housing Benefit and Council Tax Benefit (Miscellaneous Amendments) Regulations 1995 (S.I. 1995/560)
 Social Security (Contributions) (Re–rating and National Insurance Fund Payments) Order 1995 (S.I. 1995/561)
 National Health Service (Determination of Districts) Order 1995 (S.I. 1995/562)
 National Health Service (District Health Authorities) Order 1995 (S.I. 1995/563)
 United Leeds Teaching Hospitals National Health Service Trust (Transfer of Trust Property) Order 1995 (S.I. 1995/564)
 Wolverley National Health Service Trust (Transfer of Trust Property) Order 1995 (S.I. 1995/565)
 Statutory Maternity Pay (Compensation of Employers) Amendment Regulations 1995 (S.I. 1995/566)
 North Wales Ambulance National Health Service Trust (Transfer of Trust Property) Order 1995 (S.I. 1995/567)
 Gwynedd Hospitals National Health Service Trust (Transfer of Trust Property) Order 1995 (S.I. 1995/568)
 Gwynedd Community Health National Health Service Trust (Transfer of Trust Property) Order 1995 (S.I. 1995/569)
 Local Government Reorganisation (Wales) (Transitional Provisions) Order 1995 (S.I. 1995/570)
 Gaming Act (Variation of Fees) (Scotland) Order 1995 (S.I. 1995/571)
 Valuation Appeal Committee (Procedure in Appeals under the Valuation Acts) (Scotland) Regulations 1995 (S.I. 1995/572)
 Valuation Roll and Valuation Notice (Scotland) Amendment Order 1995 (S.I. 1995/573)
 State Hospitals Board for Scotland Order 1995 (S.I. 1995/574)
 Mental Health (State Hospital Management Committee, State Hospital, Carstairs) (Scotland) Transfer and Dissolution Order 1995 (S.I. 1995/575)
 State Hospitals (Scotland) Act 1994 Commencement Order 1995 (S.I. 1995/576)
 National Health Service Trusts (Originating Capital Debt) (Scotland) Order 1995 (S.I. 1995/577)
 Licensed Betting Offices (Amendment) Regulations 1995 (S.I. 1995/578)
 Betting, Gaming and Lotteries Act 1963 (Schedule 4) (Amendment) Order 1995 (S.I. 1995/579)
 Social Security Benefits Up-rating Regulations 1995 (S.I. 1995/580)
 Social Security (Industrial Injuries) (Dependency) (Permitted Earnings Limits) Order 1995 (S.I. 1995/581)
 Magistrates' Courts (Amendment) Rules 1995 (S.I. 1995/585)
 Insolvency (Amendment) Rules 1995 (S.I. 1995/586)
 Education (Grant–maintained Schools) (Finance) (Wales) Regulations 1995 (S.I. 1995/587)
 Companies Act 1985 (Audit Exemption) (Amendment) Regulations 1995 (S.I. 1995/589)
 Local Government Changes for England Regulations 1995 (S.I. 1995/590)
 Police (Scotland) Amendment (No.2) Regulations 1995 (S.I. 1995/596)
 Council Tax (Discounts) (Scotland) Amendment Regulations 1995 (S.I. 1995/597)
 Council Tax (Exempt Dwellings) (Scotland) Amendment Order 1995 (S.I. 1995/598)
 Council Tax (Discounts) (Scotland) Amendment Order 1995 (S.I. 1995/599)
 Humberside (Structural Change) Order 1995 (S.I. 1995/600)

601-700

 Teacher Training Agency (Additional Functions) Order 1995 (S.I. 1995/601)
 Education (Teachers) (Amendment) Regulations 1995 (S.I. 1995/602)
 Education (Bursaries for Teacher Training) (Amendment) Regulations 1995 (S.I. 1995/603)
 Education (University Commissioners) Order 1995 (S.I. 1995/604)
 Education (Grants for Education Support and Training) (England) Regulations 1995 (S.I. 1995/605)
 Plant Breeders' Rights (Fees) (Amendment) Regulations 1995 (S.I. 1995/606)
 Seeds (National Lists of Varieties) (Fees) (Amendment) Regulations 1995 (S.I. 1995/607)
 Norfolk and Suffolk Broads (Extension of Byelaws) Order 1995 (S.I. 1995/608)
 Non–Domestic Rating (Alteration of Lists and Appeals) (Amendment) Regulations 1995 (S.I. 1995/609)
 North Yorkshire (District of York) (Structural and Boundary Changes) Order 1995 (S.I. 1995/610)
 Capital Allowances (Corresponding Northern Ireland Grants) Order 1995 (S.I. 1995/611)
 Sugar Beet (Research and Education) Order 1995 (S.I. 1995/612)
 Bovine Offal (Prohibition) (Amendment) Regulations 1995 (S.I. 1995/613)
 Animal By-Products (Identification) Regulations 1995 (S.I. 1995/614)
 Common Agricultural Policy (Wine) Regulations 1995 (S.I. 1995/615)
 Road Traffic (Special Parking Area) (London Borough of Redbridge) (Amendment) Order 1995 (S.I. 1995/616)
 Road Traffic (Special Parking Area) (Royal Borough of Kingston upon Thames) (Amendment) Order 1995 (S.I. 1995/617)
 Road Traffic (Special Parking Area) (London Borough of Sutton) (Amendment) Order 1995 (S.I. 1995/618)
 Council Tax (Discount Disregards and Exempt Dwellings) (Amendment) Order 1995 (S.I. 1995/619)
 Council Tax (Liability for Owners and Additional Provisions for Discount Disregards) (Amendment) Regulations 1995 (S.I. 1995/620)
 Family Health Services Appeal Authority (Establishment and Constitution) Order 1995 (S.I. 1995/621)
 Family Health Services Appeal Authority Regulations 1995 (S.I. 1995/622)
 Local Government Changes for England (Non-Domestic Rating, Alteration of Lists and Appeals) Regulations 1995 (S.I. 1995/623)
 Local Government Changes for England (Community Charge and Council Tax, Valuation and Community Charge Tribunals and Alteration of Lists and Appeals) Regulations 1995 (S.I. 1995/624)
 Housing Benefit, Council Tax Benefit and Income Support (Amendments) Regulations 1995 (S.I. 1995/625)
 Housing Benefit and Council Tax Benefit (Miscellaneous Amendments) (No. 2) Regulation 1995 (S.I. 1995/626)
 Education (London Residuary Body) (Property Transfer) (Modification and Amendment) Order 1995 (S.I. 1995/627)
 Education (Ballot Expenditure) Regulations 1995 (S.I. 1995/628)
 Education (Payment for Special Educational Needs Supplies) (Amendment) Regulations 1995 (S.I. 1995/629)
 Research Councils (Transfer of Property etc.) Order 1995 (S.I. 1995/630)
 Judicial Pensions and Retirement Act 1993 (Commencement) Order 1995 (S.I. 1995/631)
 Judicial Pensions (Miscellaneous) Regulations 1995 (S.I. 1995/632)
 Judicial Pensions (Qualifying Judicial Offices etc.) (City of London) Order 1995 (S.I. 1995/633)
 Judicial Pensions (Preservation of Benefits) Order 1995 (S.I. 1995/634)
 Judicial Pensions (Appeals) Regulations 1995 (S.I. 1995/635)
 Judicial Pensions (Transfer Between Judicial Pension Schemes) Regulations 1995 (S.I. 1995/636)
 Judicial Pensions (Transfer of Accrued Benefits) Regulations 1995 (S.I. 1995/637)
 Judicial Pensions (Contributions) Regulations 1995 (S.I. 1995/638)
 Judicial Pensions (Additional Voluntary Contributions) Regulations 1995 (S.I. 1995/639)
 Judicial Pensions (Additional Benefits for Disregarded Earnings) Regulations 1995 (S.I. 1995/640)
 Courts and Legal Services Act 1990 (Commencement No. 10) Order 1995 (S.I. 1995/641)
 National Health Service (Travelling Expenses and Remission of Charges) Amendment Regulations 1995 (S.I. 1995/642)
 National Health Service (Charges for Drugs and Appliances) Amendment Regulations 1995 (S.I. 1995/643)
 National Health Service (Pharmaceutical Services) Amendment Regulations 1995 (S.I. 1995/644)
 Charities (Exemption from Accounting Requirements) (Scotland) Amendment Regulations 1995 (S.I. 1995/645)
 Registration of Births, Deaths, Marriages and Divorces (Fees) (Scotland) Amendment Regulations 1995 (S.I. 1995/646)
 Police (Discipline) (Miscellaneous Amendments) (Scotland) Regulations 1995 (S.I. 1995/647)
 Defence Evaluation and Research Agency Trading Fund Order 1995 (S.I. 1995/650)
 Local Authorities (Discretionary Expenditure Limits) (England) Order 1995 (S.I. 1995/651)
 Value Added Tax (Supply of Pharmaceutical Goods) Order 1995 (S.I. 1995/652)
 Value Added Tax (Transport) Order 1995 (S.I. 1995/653)
 Natural History Museum (Authorised Repositories) Order 1995 (S.I. 1995/654)
 Wireless Telegraphy (Television Licence Fees) (Amendment) Regulations 1995 (S.I. 1995/655)
 Northern Ireland (Loans) (Increase of Limit) Order 1995 (S.I. 1995/675)
 Local Government, Planning and Land Act 1980 (Competition) (Scotland) Regulations 1995 (S.I. 1995/677)
 Local Government (Exemption from Competition) (Scotland) Order 1995 (S.I. 1995/678)
 Road Traffic (Special Parking Areas) (London Borough of Lambeth) (Amendment) Order 1995 (S.I. 1995/679)
 Road Traffic (Special Parking Area) (London Borough of Merton) (Amendment) Order 1995 (S.I. 1995/680)
 Police and Magistrates' Courts Act 1994 (Commencement No. 8 and Transitional Provisions) Order 1995 (S.I. 1995/685)
 Justices' Chief Executives and Justices' Clerks (Appointment) Regulations 1995 (S.I. 1995/686)
 Electricity (Standards of Performance) (Amendment) Regulations 1995 (S.I. 1995/687)
 Insurance (Fees) Regulations 1995 (S.I. 1995/688)
 Public Service Vehicles (Operators' Licences) (Amendment) Regulation 1995 (S.I. 1995/689)
 National Health Service (Optical Charges and Payments) Amendment (No. 2) Regulations 1995 (S.I. 1995/691)
 National Health Service (Functions of Family Health Services Authorities) (Prescribing Incentive Schemes) Regulations 1995 (S.I. 1995/692)
 National Health Service (Fund-holding Practices) Amendment Regulations 1995 (S.I. 1995/693)
 Time Off for Public Duties Order 1995 (S.I. 1995/694)
 National Health Service (Expenses of Audit) (Scotland) Regulations 1995 (S.I. 1995/698)
 National Health Service (Charges for Drugs and Appliances) (Scotland) Amendment Regulations 1995 (S.I. 1995/699)
 National Health Service (Travelling Expenses and Remission of Charges) (Scotland) Amendment Regulations 1995 (S.I. 1995/700)

701-800

 Local Authorities Etc. (Allowances) (Scotland) Amendment Regulations 1995 (S.I. 1995/701)
 Local Government etc. (Scotland) Act 1994 (Commencement No.3) Order 1995 (S.I. 1995/702)
 National Health Service (Dental Charges) (Scotland) Amendment Regulations 1995 (S.I. 1995/703)
 National Health Service (General Ophthalmic Services) (Scotland) Amendment Regulations 1995 (S.I. 1995/704)
 National Health Service (Optical Charges and Payments) (Scotland) Amendment (No.2) Regulations 1995 (S.I. 1995/705)
 Police (Common Police Services) (Scotland) Revocation Order 1995 (S.I. 1995/706)
 Common Police Services (Scotland) Order 1995 (S.I. 1995/707)
 Pensions Increase (Review) Order 1995 (S.I. 1995/708)
 Friendly Societies (General Charge and Fees) Regulations 1995 (S.I. 1995/709)
 Friendly Societies Act 1992 (Transitional and Consequential Provisions) Regulations 1995 (S.I. 1995/710)
 Building Societies (General Charge and Fees) Regulations 1995 (S.I. 1995/711)
 Industrial and Provident Societies (Credit Unions) (Amendment of Fees) Regulations 1995 (S.I. 1995/712)
 Industrial and Provident Societies (Amendment of Fees) Regulations 1995 (S.I. 1995/713)
 Social Security (Contributions) Amendment (No. 2) Regulations 1995 (S.I. 1995/714)
 Criminal Justice and Public Order Act 1994 (Commencement No. 6) Order 1995 (S.I. 1995/721)
 Police (Disposal of Sound Equipment) Regulations 1995 (S.I. 1995/722)
 Police (Retention and Disposal of Vehicles) Regulations 1995 (S.I. 1995/723)
 Social Security (Contributions) Amendment (No. 3) Regulations 1995 (S.I. 1995/730)
 Welfare of Animals (Slaughter or Killing) Regulations 1995 (S.I. 1995/731)
 Spirit Drinks (Amendment) Regulations 1995 (S.I. 1995/732)
 Rheoliadau (Diwygio) (Ffurflenni a Dogfenni Cymraeg) Cwmnïau 1995 (S.I. 1995/734)
 Companies (Welsh Language Forms and Document) (Amendment) Regulations 1995 (S.I. 1995/734)
 Measuring Equipment (Capacity Measures and Testing Equipment) Regulations 1995 (S.I. 1995/735)
 Companies (Forms) (Amendment) Regulations 1995 (S.I. 1995/736)
 Road Vehicles (Construction and Use) (Amendment) (No. 2) Regulations 1995 (S.I. 1995/737)
 Offshore Installations and Pipeline Works (Management and Administration) Regulations 1995 (S.I. 1995/738)
 European Parliamentary (United Kingdom Representatives) Pensions (Additional Voluntary Contributions Scheme) (No. 2) Order 1995 (S.I. 1995/739)
 Stornoway Harbour Revision Order 1995 (S.I. 1995/740)
 Law Hospital National Health Service Trust (Establishment) Amendment Order 1995 (S.I. 1995/741)
 Royal Infirmary of Edinburgh National Health Service Trust (Establishment) Amendment Order 1995 (S.I. 1995/742)
 Offshore Installations (Prevention of Fire and Explosion, and Emergency Response) Regulations 1995 (S.I. 1995/743)
 Registration of Births, Deaths and Marriages (Miscellaneous Amendments) Regulations 1995 (S.I. 1995/744)
 Cardiff-Glan Conwy Trunk Road (A470) (Felinfach By-Pass) Order 1995 (S.I. 1995/745)
 Workmen's Compensation (Supplementation) (Amendment) Scheme 1995 (S.I. 1995/746)
 Combined Probation Areas (Essex) Order 1995 (S.I. 1995/747)
 County Council of Humberside (River Hull Bridge) Scheme 1994 Confirmation Instrument 1995 (S.I. 1995/748)
 Registered Establishments (Fees) (Scotland) Order 1995 (S.I. 1995/749)
 Local Government (Superannuation and Compensation for Premature Retirement) (Scotland) Amendment Regulations 1995 (S.I. 1995/750)
 European Communities (Designation) (No. 2) Order 1995 (S.I. 1995/751)
 Intelligence Services Act 1994 (Dependent Territories) Order 1995 (S.I. 1995/752)
 Health Service Commissioner (Family Health Services Appeal Authority) Order 1995 (S.I. 1995/753)
 Appropriation (Northern Ireland) Order 1995 (S.I. 1995/754)
 Children (Northern Ireland) Order 1995 (S.I. 1995/755)
 Children (Northern Ireland Consequential Amendments) Order 1995 (S.I. 1995/756)
 Children's Evidence (Northern Ireland) Order 1995 (S.I. 1995/757)
 Fair Employment (Amendment) (Northern Ireland) Order 1995 (S.I. 1995/758)
 Local Government (Miscellaneous Provisions) (Northern Ireland) Order 1995 (S.I. 1995/759)
 Prevention of Terrorism (Temporary Provisions) Act 1989 (Enforcement of External Orders) Order 1995 (S.I. 1995/760)
 Wildlife (Amendment) (Northern Ireland) Order 1995 (S.I. 1995/761)
 Double Taxation Relief (Taxes on Income) (Azerbaijan) Order 1995 (S.I. 1995/762)
 Double Taxation Relief (Taxes on Income) (Malta) Order 1995 (S.I. 1995/763)
 Double Taxation Relief (Taxes on Income) (Republic of Ireland) Order 1995 (S.I. 1995/764)
 Double Taxation Relief (Taxes on Income) (Spain) Order 1995 (S.I. 1995/765)
 Naval, Military and Air Forces etc. (Disablement and Death) Service Pensions Amendment Order 1995 (S.I. 1995/766)
 Social Security (Reciprocal Agreements) Order 1995 (S.I. 1995/767)
 Trustee Investments (Additional Powers) Order 1995 (S.I. 1995/768)
 Glan–y–Mor National Health Service Trust (Establishment) Order 1995 (S.I. 1995/769)
 University Hospital of Wales Healthcare National Health Service Trust (Establishment) Order 1995 (S.I. 1995/770)
 Local Government (Application of Enactments) (Scotland) Order 1995 (S.I. 1995/789)
 National Health Service Trusts (Originating Capital Debt) Amendment Order 1995 (S.I. 1995/791)
 Homewood National Health Service Trust Dissolution Order 1995 (S.I. 1995/792)
 Legal Advice and Assistance (Amendment) Regulations 1995 (S.I. 1995/795)
 Legal Aid in Criminal and Care Proceedings (General) (Amendment) (No. 2) Regulations 1995 (S.I. 1995/796)
 Civil Legal Aid (Assessment of Resources) (Amendment) Regulations 1995 (S.I. 1995/797)
 Local Government Changes for England (Capital Finance) Regulations 1995 (S.I. 1995/798)
 Medicines (Medicated Animal Feeding Stuffs) (Amendment) Regulations 1995 (S.I. 1995/799)

801-900

 United Leeds Teaching Hospitals National Health Service Trust Dissolution Order 1995 (S.I. 1995/801)
 Licensed Betting Offices (Scotland) Amendment Regulations 1995 (S.I. 1995/802)
 Prevention of Terrorism (Temporary Provisions) Act 1989 (Continuance) Order 1995 (S.I. 1995/816)
 Local Government (Compensation for Redundancy and Premature Retirement) (Amendment) Regulations 1995 (S.I. 1995/817)
 Registration of Births and Deaths (Welsh Language) (Amendment) Regulations 1995 (S.I. 1995/818)
 A638 Trunk Road (Doncaster Road Railway Bridge, Agbrigg, To Junction With B6273 Garmil Lane, West Of Wragby) (Detrunking) Order 1995 (S.I. 1995/819)
 Local Government Act 1988 (Defined Activities) (Exemption) (Sports and Leisure Management, Catering and Maintenance of Ground) Order 1995 (S.I. 1995/828)
 Social Security (Incapacity Benefit) (Consequential and Transitional Amendments and Savings) Regulations 1995 (S.I. 1995/829)
 Elections (Welsh Forms) Order 1995 (S.I. 1995/830)
 London Cab Order 1995 (S.I. 1995/837)
 Housing Renovation etc. Grants (Reduction of Grant) (Amendment) Regulations 1995 (S.I. 1995/838)
 Housing Renovation etc. Grants (Prescribed Forms and Particulars) (Amendment) Regulations 1995 (S.I. 1995/839)
 Local Government (Education Administration) (Compensation for Redundancy or Premature Retirement on Reorganisation) (Scotland) Regulations 1995 (S.I. 1995/840)
 Local Government and Housing Act 1989 (Commencement No. 17) Order 1995 (S.I. 1995/841)
 Newham Community Health Services National Health Service Trust (Establishment) Order 1995 (S.I. 1995/842)
 City and Hackney Community Services National Health Service Trust (Establishment) Order 1995 (S.I. 1995/843)
 University Hospital Birmingham National Health Service Trust (Establishment) Order 1995 (S.I. 1995/844)
 Royal Orthopaedic Hospital National Health Service Trust (Establishment) Order 1995 (S.I. 1995/845)
 Wolverley National Health Service Trust Dissolution Order 1995 (S.I. 1995/846)
 Tower Hamlets Healthcare National Health Service Trust (Establishment) Order 1995 (S.I. 1995/847)
 Surrey Heartlands National Health Service Trust (Establishment) Order 1995 (S.I. 1995/848)
 Local Authorities (Companies) Order 1995 (S.I. 1995/849)
 Local Authorities (Capital Finance and Approved Investments) (Amendment) Regulations 1995 (S.I. 1995/850)
 Local Government (Wales) Act 1994 (Commencement No. 3) (Amendment) Order 1995 (S.I. 1995/851)
 Local Government (Wales) Act 1994 (Commencement No. 4) Order 1995 (S.I. 1995/852)
 Income Tax (Employments) (Incapacity Benefit) Regulations 1995 (S.I. 1995/853)
 Housing (Change of Landlord) (Payment of Disposal Cost by Instalments) (Amendment) Regulations 1995 (S.I. 1995/854)
 Miners' Welfare Act 1952 (Transfer of Functions of Coal Industry Social Welfare Organisation) Order 1995 (S.I. 1995/855)
 Housing Renovation etc. Grants (Prescribed Forms and Particulars) (Welsh Forms and Particulars) (Amendment) Regulations 1995 (S.I. 1995/857)
 National Assistance (Assessment of Resources) (Amendment) Regulations 1995 (S.I. 1995/858)
 Welsh Highland Railway (Transfer) Light Railway Order 1995 (S.I. 1995/861)
 National Health Service (Injury Benefits) Regulations 1995 (S.I. 1995/866)
 A312 Trunk Road (The Parkway, Hounslow) (50 mph Speed Limit) Order 1995 (S.I. 1995/870)
 Medicines (Fixing of Fees Relating to Medicinal Products for Human Use) Amendment Order 1995 (S.I. 1995/871)
 Housing Benefit and Council tax Benefit (Subsidy) Order 1995 (S.I. 1995/872)
 Housing Benefit and Council Tax Benefit (Subsidy) Amendment Regulations 1995 (S.I. 1995/874)
 Fish Health (Amendment) Regulations 1995 (S.I. 1995/886)
 Plant Protection Products Regulations 1995 (S.I. 1995/887)
 Plant Protection Products (Fees) Regulations 1995 (S.I. 1995/888)
 Road Traffic Accident (Payments for Treatment) Order 1995 (S.I. 1995/889)
 Farm and Conservation Grant (Variation) Scheme 1995 (S.I. 1995/890)
 Heather Moorland (Livestock Extensification) (Scotland) Regulations 1995 (S.I. 1995/891)
 Police and Magistrates' Courts Act 1994 (Commencement No. 5 and Transitional Provisions) (Amendment No. 2) Order 1995 (S.I. 1995/899)
 Local Government Superannuation (Limitation on Earnings and Reckonable Service) Regulations 1995 (S.I. 1995/900)

901-1000

 Local Government Superannuation (Equality and Maternity Absence) Regulations 1995 (S.I. 1995/901)
 Education (School Curriculum and Assessment Authority) (Transfer of Functions) Order 1995 (S.I. 1995/903)
 Moorland (Livestock Extensification) Regulations 1995 (S.I. 1995/904)
 Third Country Fishing (Enforcement) Order 1995 (S.I. 1995/907)
 Sea Fishing (Enforcement of Community Quota Measures) Order 1995 (S.I. 1995/908)
 Electricity (Class Exemptions from the Requirement for a Licence) (No. 2) Order 1995 (S.I. 1995/909)
 Prisons (Scotland) Act 1989 (Release of Prisoners etc.) Order 1995 (S.I. 1995/910)
 Prisoners and Criminal Proceedings (Scotland) Act 1993 (Release of Prisoners etc.) Order 1995 (S.I. 1995/911)
 Local Authorities Etc. (Allowances) (Scotland) Regulations 1995 (S.I. 1995/912)
 Value Added Tax (General) (Amendment) (No. 2) Regulations 1995 (S.I. 1995/913)
 Leeds Development Corporation (Area and Constitution) Order 1995 (S.I. 1995/916)
 Profit–Related Pay (Shortfall Recovery) Regulations 1995 (S.I. 1995/917)
 Llandough Hospital National Health Service Trust (Change of Name) Order 1995 (S.I. 1995/918)
 Education (Individual Pupils' Achievements) (Information) (Amendment) Regulations 1995 (S.I. 1995/924)
 Motor Vehicles (Type Approval and Approval Marks) (Fees) Regulations 1995 (S.I. 1995/925)
 Gaming Act (Variation of Monetary Limits) Order 1995 (S.I. 1995/926)
 Gaming Clubs (Hours and Charges) (Amendment) Regulations 1995 (S.I. 1995/927)
 Amusements with Prizes (Variation of Monetary Limits) Order 1995 (S.I. 1995/928)
 Railtrack PLC (Rateable Values) (Scotland) Order 1995 (S.I. 1995/929)
 British Railways Board (Rateable Values) (Scotland) Order 1995 (S.I. 1995/930)
 Portsmouth Hospitals National Health Service Trust (Transfer of Trust Property) Order 1995 (S.I. 1995/932)
 Portsmouth Health Care National Health Service Trust (Transfer of Trust Property) Order 1995 (S.I. 1995/933)
 Hereford Hospitals National Health Service Trust (Transfer of Trust Property) Order 1995 (S.I. 1995/934)
 Dartford and Gravesham National Health Service Trust (Transfer of Trust Property) Order 1995 (S.I. 1995/935)
 Education (Grant-maintained and Grant-maintained Special Schools) (Finance) Regulations 1995 (S.I. 1995/936)
 Winchester and Eastleigh Healthcare National Health Service Trust (Transfer of Trust Property) Order 1995 (S.I. 1995/937)
 Stoke Mandeville Hospital National Health Service Trust (Transfer of Trust Property) Order 1995 (S.I. 1995/938)
 Ministry of Defence Police (Police Committee) Regulations 1995 (S.I. 1995/939)
 Public Telecommunication System Designation (Liberty Communications Limited) Order 1995 (S.I. 1995/941)
 Legal Aid in Contempt Proceedings (Remuneration) Regulations 1995 (S.I. 1995/948)
 Legal Advice and Assistance (Amendment) (No. 2) Regulations 1995 (S.I. 1995/949)
 Legal Advice and Assistance at Police Stations (Remuneration) (Amendment) Regulations 1995 (S.I. 1995/950)
 Legal Advice and Assistance (Duty Solicitor) (Remuneration) (Amendment) Regulations 1995 (S.I. 1995/951)
 Legal Aid in Criminal and Care Proceedings (Costs) (Amendment) Regulations 1995 (S.I. 1995/952)
 Value Added Tax (Special Provisions) (Amendment) Order 1995 (S.I. 1995/957)
 Value Added Tax (Treatment of Transactions) Order 1995 (S.I. 1995/958)
 Environmentally Sensitive Areas (Exmoor) Designation (Amendment) (No. 2) Order 1995 (S.I. 1995/960)
 Non–Domestic Rating (Chargeable Amounts) (Amendment) Regulations 1995 (S.I. 1995/961)
 Electricity Supply Industry (Rateable Values) (Amendment) Order 1995 (S.I. 1995/962)
 Local Government Superannuation (Miscellaneous Provisions) Regulations 1995 (S.I. 1995/963)
 Stornoway (Ferry Terminal) Harbour Revision Order 1995 (S.I. 1995/964)
 Merchant Shipping Act 1970 (Commencement No. 11) Order 1995 (S.I. 1995/965)
 Leeds Development Corporation (Dissolution) Order 1995 (S.I. 1995/966)
 Nurses, Midwives and Health Visitors (Periodic Registration) Amendment Rules Approval Order 1995 (S.I. 1995/967)
 East Surrey Hospital and Community Healthcare National Health Service Trust (Change of Name) Order 1995 (S.I. 1995/968)
 County Court (Amendment) Rules 1995 (S.I. 1995/969)
 County Court (Forms) (Amendment) Rules 1995 (S.I. 1995/970)
 Justices of the Peace (Size and Chairmanship of Bench) Rules 1995 (S.I. 1995/971)
 Merchant Shipping (Employment of Young Persons) Regulations 1995 (S.I. 1995/972)
 Injuries in War (Shore Employments) Compensation (Amendment) Scheme 1995 (S.I. 1995/979)
 Prison (Amendment) Rules 1995 (S.I. 1995/983)
 Young Offender Institution (Amendment) Rules 1995 (S.I. 1995/984)
 Social Security (Incapacity for Work) Miscellaneous Amendments Regulations 1995 (S.I. 1995/987)
 Street Works (Registers, Notices, Directions and Designations) (Amendment) Regulations 1995 (S.I. 1995/990)
 Public Record Office (Fees) Regulations 1995 (S.I. 1995/991)
 Strathclyde Regional Council Prevention of Water Pollution (Mill Glen, Busbie Muir, Munnoch, Caaf, Knockendon, Crosbie, Glenburn, Pundeavon, Cuffhill, Kirkleegreen) Byelaws Extension Order 1995 (S.I. 1995/992)
 Hyde Park and The Regent's Park (Vehicle Parking) Regulations 1995 (S.I. 1995/993)
 Strathclyde Regional Council Prevention of Water Pollution (Skelmorlie Lower, Skelmorlie Upper, Skelmorlie Intakes, Outerwards, Greeto Intake, Haylie, Millport Lower, Millport Upper) Byelaws Extension Order 1995 (S.I. 1995/994)
 Robert Jones and Agnes Hunt Orthopaedic and District Hospital National Health Service Trust (Establishment) Amendment Order 1995 (S.I. 1995/996)
 Local Government Act 1988 (Defined Activities) (Exemption) (Breckland District Council) Order 1995 (S.I. 1995/997)

1001-1100

 Premium Savings Bonds (Amendment)Regulations 1995 (S.I. 1995/1002)
 Social Security (Contributions) Amendment (No. 4) Regulations 1995 (S.I. 1995/1003)
 Civil Aviation (Route Charges for Navigation Services) (Amendment) Regulations 1995 (S.I. 1995/1004)
 Building Societies (Commercial Assets) Order 1995 (S.I. 1995/1006)
 Income and Corporation Taxes Act 1988, section 737A, (Appointed Day) Order 1995 (S.I. 1995/1007)
 A5 Trunk Road (Junction 18 (M1) to A5/A5 Link Road Junction) Order 1995 (S.I. 1995/1009)
 Weights and Measures (Guernsey and Alderney) Order 1995 (S.I. 1995/1011)
 N-nitrosamines and N-nitrosatable Substances in Elastomer or Rubber Teats and Dummies (Safety) Regulations 1995 (S.I. 1995/1012)
 Contracting Out (Functions in relation to the Registration of Companies) Order 1995 (S.I. 1995/1013)
 Measuring Equipment (Liquid Fuel and Lubricants) Regulations 1995 (S.I. 1995/1014)
 Education (School Teachers' Pay and Conditions) Order 1995 (S.I. 1995/1015)
 Local Government Pension Scheme Regulations 1995 (S.I. 1995/1019)
 Gaming Act (Variation of Monetary Limits) (Scotland) Order 1995 (S.I. 1995/1020)
 Amusements with Prizes (Variation of Monetary Limits) (Scotland) Order 1995 (S.I. 1995/1021)
 Gaming Clubs (Hours and Charges) (Scotland) Amendment Regulations 1995 (S.I. 1995/1022)
 Act of Sederunt (Rules of the Court of Session 1994 Amendment) (Shorthand Writers' Fees) 1995 (S.I. 1995/1023)
 Act of Sederunt (Fees of Shorthand Writers in the Sheriff Court) (Amendment) 1995 (S.I. 1995/1024)
 Antarctic Act 1994 (Overseas Territories) Order 1995 (S.I. 1995/1030)
 Child Abduction and Custody (Parties to Conventions) (Amendment) (No. 2) Order 1995 (S.I. 1995/1031)
 United Nations Arms Embargoes (Dependent Territories) Order 1995 (S.I. 1995/1032)
 Antarctic Act 1994 (Guernsey) Order 1995 (S.I. 1995/1033)
 Antarctic Act 1994 (Jersey) Order 1995 (S.I. 1995/1034)
 Antarctic Act 1994 (Isle of Man) Order 1995 (S.I. 1995/1035)
 Parliamentary Constituencies (Wales) Order 1995 (S.I. 1995/1036)
 Parliamentary Constituencies (Scotland) Order 1995 (S.I. 1995/1037)
 Air Navigation Order 1995 (S.I. 1995/1038)
 Local Government Reorganisation (Wales) (Limitation of Compensation) Regulations 1995 (S.I. 1995/1039)
 Local Government (Wales) (Service Agency Agreements) Regulations 1995 (S.I. 1995/1040)
 Local Government Reorganisation (Wales) (Capital Finance) Order 1995 (S.I. 1995/1041)
 Local Government Reorganisation (Wales) (Transitional Provisions No. 2) Order 1995 (S.I. 1995/1042)
 Local Authorities (Closure of Accounts) (Wales) Order 1995 (S.I. 1995/1043)
 Civil Legal Aid (Scotland) (Fees) Amendment Regulations 1995 (S.I. 1995/1044)
 Child Support and Income Support (Amendment) Regulations 1995 (S.I. 1995/1045)
 Excise Goods (Drawback) Regulations 1995 (S.I. 1995/1046)
 Charities (The Bridge House Estates) Order 1995 (S.I. 1995/1047)
 A61 Trunk Road (Tankersley Roundabout, Birdwell to Old County Borough Boundary, Barnsley) (Detrunking) Order 1995 (S.I. 1995/1048)
 Personal and Occupational Pension Schemes (Pensions Ombudsman) (Procedure) Rules 1995 (S.I. 1995/1053)
 Civil Aviation (Air Travel Organisers' Licensing) Regulations 1995 (S.I. 1995/1054)
 Local Government Changes For England (No. 2) Regulations 1995 (S.I. 1995/1055)
 Police Cadets (Scotland) Amendment Regulations 1995 (S.I. 1995/1057)
 Portsmouth (Camber Dock) Harbour Revision Order 1995 (S.I. 1995/1063)
 Civil Legal Aid (Scotland) Amendment Regulations 1995 (S.I. 1995/1065)
 Advice and Assistance (Scotland) Amendment Regulations 1995 (S.I. 1995/1066)
 Free Zone (Humberside) Designation (Variation) Order 1995 (S.I. 1995/1067)
 Value Added Tax (General) (Amendment) (No. 3) Regulations 1995 (S.I. 1995/1069)
 Social Security Revaluation of Earnings Factors Order 1995 (S.I. 1995/1070)
 London Regional Transport (Penalty Fares) Act 1992 (Activating No. 2) Order 1995 (S.I. 1995/1071)
 Wireless Telegraphy (Short Range Devices) (Exemption) (Amendment) Regulations 1995 (S.I. 1995/1081)
 Financial Assistance for Environmental Purposes (No. 3) Order 1995 (S.I. 1995/1085)
 Dairy Products (Hygiene) Regulations 1995 (S.I. 1995/1086)
 South and East Wales Ambulance National Health Service Trust (Transfer of Trust Property) Order 1995 (S.I. 1995/1088)
 Morriston Hospital National Health Service Trust (Transfer of Trust Property) Order 1995 (S.I. 1995/1089)
 Nevill Hall and District National Health Service Trust (Transfer of Trust Property) Order 1995 (S.I. 1995/1090)
 St Michaels Mead Natural Gas Pipe-lines Order 1995 (S.I. 1995/1091)
 Charities (Trustee Investments Act 1961) Order 1995 (S.I. 1995/1092)
 Air Navigation (General) (Amendment) Regulations 1995 (S.I. 1995/1093)
 M25 Motorway (Junctions 10 to 15) (Variable Speed Limits) Regulations 1995 (S.I. 1995/1094)

1101-1200

 East Glamorgan National Health Service Trust (Transfer of Trust Property) Order 1995 (S.I. 1995/1107)
 Medicines (Products for Human Use — Fees) Regulations 1995 (S.I. 1995/1116)
 North Wales Ambulance National Health Service Trust (Transfer of Trust Property) (No. 2) Order 1995 (S.I. 1995/1121)
 Dairy Products (Hygiene) (Charges) Regulations 1995 (S.I. 1995/1122)
 Special Trustees for the Royal Free Hospital (Transfer of Trust Property) Order 1995 (S.I. 1995/1123)
 Camden and Islington Community Health Services National Health Service Trust (Transfer of Trust Property) Order 1995 (S.I. 1995/1124)
 Whittington Hospital National Health Service Trust (Transfer of Trust Property) Order 1995 (S.I. 1995/1125)
 Special Trustees for the Middlesex Hospital (Transfer of Trust Property) Order 1995 (S.I. 1995/1126)
 North Yorkshire Health Authority (Transfer of Trust Property) Order 1995 (S.I. 1995/1127)
 Royal London Homoeopathic Hospital National Health Service Trust (Transfer of Trust Property) Order 1995 (S.I. 1995/1128)
 Special Trustees for University College Hospital (Transfer of Trust Property) Order 1995 (S.I. 1995/1129)
 London Priority Route (Amendment) Order 1995 (S.I. 1995/1130)
 Town and Country Planning (Crown Land Applications) Regulations 1995 (S.I. 1995/1139)
 Returning Officers (Parliamentary Constituencies) (Wales) Order 1995 (S.I. 1995/1142)
 Welfare Food (Amendment) Regulations 1995 (S.I. 1995/1143)
 A23 Trunk Road (Streatham High Road, Lambeth) (Prohibition of Use of Gaps in Central Reserve) Order 1995 (S.I. 1995/1144)
 Dual-Use and Related Goods (Export Control) (Suspension No. 2) Regulations 1995 (S.I. 1995/1151)
 Social Security (Recoupment) (Prolongation of Period for Furnishing of Certificate of Total Benefit) Order 1995 (S.I. 1995/1152)
 A19 Trunk Road (New Parks Bends Improvement) Order 1995 (S.I. 1995/1153)
 Street Works (Registers, Notices, Directionsand Designations) (Amendment No. 2) Regulations 1995 (S.I. 1995/1154)
 Redundancy Payments (Local Government) (Modification) (Amendment) Order 1995 (S.I. 1995/1157)
 A4 Trunk Road (Great West Road, Hounslow) (Prohibition of U-Turns) Order 1995 (S.I. 1995/1158)
 Moorland (Livestock Extensification) (Wales) Regulations 1995 (S.I. 1995/1159)
 Local Government Reorganisation (Wales) (Transitional Provisions No. 3) Order 1995 (S.I. 1995/1161)
 Motor Vehicles (Driving Licences) (Large Goods and Passenger-Carrying Vehicles) (Amendment) Regulations 1995 (S.I. 1995/1162)
 Companies Act 1989 Part II (Consequential Amendments) Regulations 1995 (S.I. 1995/1163)
 Vaccine Damage Payments (Specified Disease) Order 1995 (S.I. 1995/1164)
 A1 Trunk Road (Islington) Red Route Traffic Order 1993 Variation Order 1995 (S.I. 1995/1165)
 A1 Trunk Road (Islington) Red Route (Prohibition of U-Turn) Traffic Order 1995 (S.I. 1995/1166)
 London Cab (No. 2) Order 1995 (S.I. 1995/1181)
 Local Government Act 1988 (Defined Activities) (Exemption) (Housing Management) (England) Order 1995 (S.I. 1995/1182)
 Income Tax (Building Societies) (Dividends and Interest) (Amendment) Regulations 1995 (S.I. 1995/1184)
 Lloyd's Underwriters (Special Reserve Funds) (Amendment) Regulations 1995 (S.I. 1995/1185)
 Electrical Equipment for Explosive Atmospheres (Certification) (Amendment) Regulations 1995 (S.I. 1995/1186)
 Building Societies (Aggregation) (Amendment) Rules 1995 (S.I. 1995/1187)
 Building Societies (Designation of Qualifying Bodies) Order 1995 (S.I. 1995/1188)
 Building Societies (Provision of Services) Order 1995 (S.I. 1995/1189)
 Motor Vehicles (Driving Licences) (Amendment) Regulations 1995 (S.I. 1995/1200)

1201-1300

 Road Vehicles (Construction and Use) (Amendment) (No. 3) Regulations 1995 (S.I. 1995/1201)
 Education (London Residuary Body) (Property Transfer) (Modification and Amendment) (No. 2) Order 1995 (S.I. 1995/1202)
 Customs Traders (Accounts and Records) Regulations 1995 (S.I. 1995/1203)
 Merchant Shipping (Survey and Certification) Regulations 1995 (S.I. 1995/1210)
 Life Assurance (Apportionment of Receipts of Participating Funds) (Applicable Percentage) (Amendment) Order 1995 (S.I. 1995/1211)
 Income Tax (Interest Relief) (Housing Associations) (Amendment) Regulations 1995 (S.I. 1995/1212)
 Income Tax (Interest Relief) (Amendment) Regulations 1995 (S.I. 1995/1213)
 Mackerel (Specified Sea Areas) (Prohibition of Fishing) (No. 2) Order 1995 (S.I. 1995/1214)
 Occupational Pension Schemes (Equal Access to Membership) Amendment Regulations 1995 (S.I. 1995/1215)
 Air Passenger Duty (Extended Schemes) Regulations 1995 (S.I. 1995/1216)
 Banking Coordination (Second Council Directive) (Amendment) Regulations 1995 (S.I. 1995/1217)
 Motor Cars (Driving Instruction) (Amendment) Regulations 1995 (S.I. 1995/1218)
 Advice and Assistance (Assistance by Way of Representation) (Scotland) Amendment Regulations 1995 (S.I. 1995/1219)
 Advice and Assistance (Financial Conditions) (Scotland) Regulations 1995 (S.I. 1995/1220)
 Civil Legal Aid (Financial Conditions) (Scotland) Regulations 1995 (S.I. 1995/1221)
 Criminal Legal Aid (Scotland) (Prescribed Proceedings) Amendment Regulations 1995 (S.I. 1995/1222)
 Income Tax (Employments) (Amendment No. 3) Regulations 1995 (S.I. 1995/1223)
 British Museum (Authorised Repositories) Order 1995 (S.I. 1995/1224)
 British Railways (Marylebone Diesel Depot) Order 1995 (S.I. 1995/1228)
 Social Fund Maternity and Funeral Expenses (General) Amendment Regulations 1995 (S.I. 1995/1229)
 Glan Hafren National Health Service Trust (Transfer of Trust Property) Order 1995 (S.I. 1995/1232)
 Powys Health Care National Health Service Trust (Transfer of Trust Property) Order 1995 (S.I. 1995/1233)
 South and East Wales Ambulance National Health Service Trust (Transfer of Trust Property) (No. 2) Order 1995 (S.I. 1995/1234)
 Bexley Community Health National Health Service Trust (Change of Name) Order 1995 (S.I. 1995/1235)
 Foxfield Light Railway Order 1995 (S.I. 1995/1236)
 Pipe-lines (Inquiries Procedure) Rules 1995 (S.I. 1995/1239)
 Education (Mandatory Awards) (Amendment) Regulations 1995 (S.I. 1995/1240)
 Education (Fees and Awards) (Amendment) Regulations 1995 (S.I. 1995/1241)
 North East Worcestershire Community Health Care National Health Service Trust (Transfer of Trust Property) Order 1995 (S.I. 1995/1242)
 Mancunian Community Health National Health Service Trust (Transfer of Trust Property) Order 1995 (S.I. 1995/1243)
 Wirral Community Healthcare National Health Service Trust (Transfer of Trust Property) Order 1995 (S.I. 1995/1244)
 Havering Hospitals National Health Service Trust (Transfer of Trust Property) Order 1995 (S.I. 1995/1245)
 BHB Community Health Care National Health Service Trust (Transfer of Trust Property) Order 1995 (S.I. 1995/1246)
 Haringey Health Care National Health Service Trust (Transfer of Trust Property) Order 1995 (S.I. 1995/1247)
 South Durham Health Care National Health Service Trust (Transfer of Trust Property) Order 1995 (S.I. 1995/1248)
 Dewsbury Health Care National Health Service Trust (Transfer of Trust Property) Order 1995 (S.I. 1995/1249)
 Consumer Credit (Exempt Agreements) (Amendment) Order 1995 (S.I. 1995/1250)
 Gas (Meters) (Amendment) Regulations 1995 (S.I. 1995/1251)
 Stanswood Bay Oyster Fishery (Variation) Order 1995 (S.I. 1995/1257)
 Calshot Oyster Fishery (Variation) Order 1995 (S.I. 1995/1258)
 Westcountry Ambulance Services National Health Service Trust (Transfer of Trust Property) Order 1995 (S.I. 1995/1259)
 Bishop Auckland Hospitals National Health Service Trust (Transfer of Trust Property) Order 1995 (S.I. 1995/1260)
 Darlington Memorial Hospital National Health Service Trust (Transfer of Trust Property) Order 1995 (S.I. 1995/1261)
 Worthing and Southlands Hospitals National Health Service Trust (Transfer of Trust Property) Order 1995 (S.I. 1995/1262)
 Mid Essex Community and Mental Health National Health Service Trust (Transfer of Trust Property) Order 1995 (S.I. 1995/1263)
 New Possibilities National Health Service Trust (Transfer of Trust Property) Order 1995 (S.I. 1995/1264)
 Salisbury Health Care National Health Service Trust (Transfer of Trust Property) Order 1995 (S.I. 1995/1265)
 Financial Services Act 1986 (Investment Advertisements) (Exemptions) Order 1995 (S.I. 1995/1266)
 Value Added Tax (Input Tax) (Amendment) (No 2) Order 1995 (S.I. 1995/1267)
 Value Added Tax (Special Provisions) Order 1995 (S.I. 1995/1268)
 Value Added Tax (Cars) (Amendment) Order 1995 (S.I. 1995/1269)
 Education (Fees and Awards) (Scotland) Amendment Regulations 1995 (S.I. 1995/1271)
 Local Review Committee (Scotland) Revocation Rules 1995 (S.I. 1995/1272)
 Parole Board (Scotland) Rules 1995 (S.I. 1995/1273)
 Value Added Tax (General) (Amendment) (No. 4) Regulations 1995 (S.I. 1995/1280)
 Income Tax (Stock Lending) (Amendment) Regulations 1995 (S.I. 1995/1283)
 Income Tax (Employments) (Amendment No. 4) Regulations 1995 (S.I. 1995/1284)
 Civil Aviation Authority (Borrowing Powers) Order 1995 (S.I. 1995/1289)
 Goods Vehicles (International Road Haulage Permits) (Revocation) Regulations 1995 (S.I. 1995/1290)
 Superannuation (Admission to the Principal Civil Service Pension Scheme) Order 1995 (S.I. 1995/1293)
 Department of Trade and Industry (Fees) (Amendment) Order 1995 (S.I. 1995/1294)
 Child Abduction and Custody (Parties to Conventions) (Amendment) (No. 3) Order 1995 (S.I. 1995/1295)
 Air Navigation (Isle of Man) (Revocation) Order 1995 (S.I. 1995/1296)
 Civil Aviation (Isle of Man) (Revocation) Order 1995 (S.I. 1995/1297)
 European Convention on Cinematographic Co-production (Amendment) Order 1995 (S.I. 1995/1298)
 Hovercraft (Application of Enactments) (Amendment) Order 1995 (S.I. 1995/1299)
 Northampton and Lamport Light Railway Order 1995 (S.I. 1995/1300)

1301-1400

 Birmingham City Council (Birmingham & Fazeley Canal Bridge) Scheme 1994 Confirmation Instrument 1995 (S.I. 1995/1301)
 City Council of Sheffield (Inner Ring Road — Stage 1A Bridge) Scheme 1994 Confirmation Instrument 1995 (S.I. 1995/1310)
 Durham County Ambulance Service National Health Service Trust (Establishment) Amendment Order 1995 (S.I. 1995/1311)
 Law of Property (Miscellaneous Provisions) Act 1994 (Commencement No. 2) Order 1995 (S.I. 1995/1317)
 Motor Vehicles (Type Approval) (Great Britain) (Amendment) Regulations 1995 (S.I. 1995/1322)
 Motor Vehicles (Type Approval for Goods Vehicles) (Great Britain) (Amendment) Regulations 1995 (S.I. 1995/1323)
 Income Tax (Manufactured Overseas Dividends) (Amendment) Regulations 1995 (S.I. 1995/1324)
 Amalgamation of the Holme Common, River Burn and Stiffkey River Internal Drainage Boards Order 1995 (S.I. 1995/1325)
 Local Government Changes for England and Local Government Act 1988 (Competition) (Miscellaneous Amendment) Regulations 1995 (S.I. 1995/1326)
 Public Trustee (Notices Affecting Land) (Title on Death) Regulations 1995 (S.I. 1995/1330)
 Wireless Telegraphy (Licence Charges) Regulations 1995 (S.I. 1995/1331)
 Heathrow Express Railway (Transfer) Order 1995 (S.I. 1995/1332)
 Road Traffic (Special Parking Area) (Royal Borough of Kingston upon Thames) (Amendment No. 2) Order 1995 (S.I. 1995/1333)
 Road Traffic (Special Parking Area) (London Borough of Sutton) (Amendment No. 2) Order 1995 (S.I. 1995/1334)
 Road Traffic (Special Parking Area) (London Borough of Redbridge) (Amendment No. 2) Order 1995 (S.I. 1995/1335)
 Local Government (Direct Service Organisations) (Competition) (Amendment) Regulations 1995 (S.I. 1995/1336)
 Income-related Benefits Schemes (Miscellaneous Amendments) (No. 2) Regulations 1995 (S.I. 1995/1339)
 Local Authorities (Staff Transfer) (Scotland) Order 1995 (S.I. 1995/1340)
 Middlesbrough College (Incorporation) Order 1995 (S.I. 1995/1341)
 Middlesbrough College (Government) Regulations 1995 (S.I. 1995/1342)
 Teesside Tertiary College (Incorporation) Order 1995 (S.I. 1995/1343)
 Teesside Tertiary College (Government) Regulations 1995 (S.I. 1995/1344)
 Fair Trading Act (Amendment) (Newspaper mergers) Order 1995 (S.I. 1995/1351)
 Companies Act 1989 (Commencement No. 15 and Transitional and Savings Provisions) Order 1995 (S.I. 1995/1352)
 Land Registration (No. 2) Rules 1995 (S.I. 1995/1354)
 Land Charges (Amendment) Rules 1995 (S.I. 1995/1355)
 Building Regulations (Amendment) Regulations 1995 (S.I. 1995/1356)
 Wolverhampton Borough Council (Wednesfield Way) (Bridge over the Wyrley and Essington Canal) Scheme 1994 Confirmation Instrument 1995 (S.I. 1995/1357)
 Plant Health (Great Britain) (Amendment) Order 1995 (S.I. 1995/1358)
 Deposit-takers (Interest Payments) (Discretionary or Accumulation Trusts) Regulations 1995 (S.I. 1995/1370)
 Motor Vehicles (Off Road Events) Regulations 1995 (S.I. 1995/1371)
 Dairy Products (Hygiene) (Scotland) Regulations 1995 (S.I. 1995/1372)
 Inshore Fishing (Prohibition of Fishing for Cockles) (Scotland) Order 1995 (S.I. 1995/1373)
 Finance Act 1995, section 24, (Appointed Day) Order 1995 (S.I. 1995/1374)
 Public Telecommunication System Designation (Mercury Personal Communications Limited) Order 1995 (S.I. 1995/1375)
 Measuring Instruments (EEC Requirements) (Fees) (Amendment) Regulations 1995 (S.I. 1995/1376)
 Local Government (Direct Labour Organisations) (Competition) (Amendment) (Crown Courts) Regulations 1995 (S.I. 1995/1377)
 Criminal Justice and Public Order Act 1994 (Commencement No. 7) Order 1995 (S.I. 1995/1378)
 Curfew Order (Responsible Officer) (City of Manchester, Reading and Norfolk) Order 1995 (S.I. 1995/1379)
 Medicines (Products Other Than Veterinary Drugs) (Prescription Only) Amendment Order 1995 (S.I. 1995/1384)
 Value Added Tax (Special Provisions) Order 1995 (Amendment) Order 1995 (S.I. 1995/1385)
 Contracting Out (Functions of the Official Receiver) Order 1995 (S.I. 1995/1386)
 Building (Approved Inspectors etc.) (Amendment) Regulations 1995 (S.I. 1995/1387)
 Food Protection (Emergency Prohibitions) (Paralytic Shellfish Poisoning) Order 1995 (S.I. 1995/1388)
 Act of Sederunt (Fees of Solicitors in the Sheriff Court) (Amendment) 1995 (S.I. 1995/1395)
 Act of Sederunt (Rules of the Court of Session 1994 Amendment No.2) (Fees of Solicitors) 1995 (S.I. 1995/1396)
 Vehicle Excise Duty (Designation of Small Islands) Order 1995 (S.I. 1995/1397)
 Children (Secure Accommodation) AmendmentRegulations 1995 (S.I. 1995/1398)

1401-1500

 Feeding Stuffs Regulations 1995 (S.I. 1995/1412)
 A41 Trunk Road (Detrunking of Slip Roads between the A41 and the A51, Chester) Order 1995 (S.I. 1995/1413)
 Food Protection (Emergency Prohibitions) (Paralytic Shellfish Poisoning) (No.2) Order 1995 (S.I. 1995/1422)
 Companies (Fees) (Amendment) Regulations 1995 (S.I. 1995/1423)
 Dual-Use and Related Goods (Export Control) (Amendment) Regulations 1995 (S.I. 1995/1424)
 Public Trustee (Fees) (Amendment) Order 1995 (S.I. 1995/1425)
 Merchant Shipping Act 1970 (Commencement No. 12) Order 1995 (S.I. 1995/1426)
 Merchant Shipping (Officer Nationality) Regulations 1995 (S.I. 1995/1427)
 Fishing Vessels (Certification of Deck Officers and Engineer Officers) (Amendment) Regulations 1995 (S.I. 1995/1428)
 Merchant Shipping (Certification of Deck and Marine Engineer Officers) (Amendment) Regulations 1995 (S.I. 1995/1429)
 Counterfeit and Pirated Goods (Customs)Regulations 1995 (S.I. 1995/1430)
 Passenger Transport Executives (Capital Finance) (Amendment) Order 1995 (S.I. 1995/1431)
 Deregulation and Contracting Out Act 1994 (Commencement No. 3) Order 1995 (S.I. 1995/1433)
 Hydrocarbons Licensing Directive Regulations 1995 (S.I. 1995/1434)
 Petroleum (Production) (Seaward Areas) (Amendment) Regulations 1995 (S.I. 1995/1435)
 Petroleum (Production) (Landward Areas) Regulations 1995 (S.I. 1995/1436)
 Road Traffic Act 1991 (Amendment of Section 76(3)) Order 1995 (S.I. 1995/1437)
 Civil Aviation (Route Charges for Navigation Services) (Second Amendment) Regulations 1995 (S.I. 1995/1438)
 Home-Grown Cereals Authority (Rate of Levy) Order 1995 (S.I. 1995/1439)
 Extraction Solvents in Food (Amendment) Regulations 1995 (S.I. 1995/1440)
 Price Marking (Amendment) Order 1995 (S.I. 1995/1441)
 Credit Institutions (Protection of Depositors) Regulations 1995 (S.I. 1995/1442)
 Pensions for Dependants of the Prime Minister or Speaker (Designated Provisions) Regulations 1995 (S.I. 1995/1443)
 Trade Marks (EC Measures Relating to Counterfeit Goods) Regulations 1995 (S.I. 1995/1444)
 Copyright (EC Measures Relating to Pirated Goods and Abolition of Restrictions on the Import of Goods) Regulations 1995 (S.I. 1995/1445)
 Suckler Cow Premium (Amendment) (No. 2) Regulations 1995 (S.I. 1995/1446)
 Counterfeit and Pirated Goods (Consequential Provisions) Regulations 1995 (S.I. 1995/1447)
 Further Education (Attribution of Surpluses and Deficits) (Margaret Danyers College) Regulations 1995 (S.I. 1995/1453)
 Coal Industry (Restructuring Grants) Order 1995 (S.I. 1995/1454)
 Vehicle Excise (Design Weight Certificate) Regulations 1995 (S.I. 1995/1455)
 Goods Vehicles (Plating and Testing) (Amendment) Regulations 1995 (S.I. 1995/1456)
 Motor Vehicles (Tests) (Amendment) Regulations 1995 (S.I. 1995/1457)
 Road Vehicles (Construction and Use) (Amendment) (No. 4) Regulations 1995 (S.I. 1995/1458)
 Inheritance Tax (Delivery of Accounts) (Scotland) Regulations 1995 (S.I. 1995/1459)
 Inheritance Tax (Delivery of Accounts) (Northern Ireland) Regulations 1995 (S.I. 1995/1460)
 Inheritance Tax (Delivery of Accounts) Regulations 1995 (S.I. 1995/1461)
 Northampton Community Healthcare National Health Service Trust (Transfer of Trust Property) Order 1995 (S.I. 1995/1462)
 Northampton General Hospital National Health Service Trust (Transfer of Trust Property) Order 1995 (S.I. 1995/1463)
 Royal Wolverhampton Hospitals National Health Service Trust (Transfer of Trust Property) Order 1995 (S.I. 1995/1464)
 Norfolk and Norwich Health Care National Health Service Trust (Transfer of Trust Property) Order 1995 (S.I. 1995/1465)
 Leicestershire Ambulance and Paramedic Service National Health Service Trust (Transfer of Trust Property) Order 1995 (S.I. 1995/1466)
 Alexandra Health Care National Health Service Trust (Transfer of Trust Property) Order 1995 (S.I. 1995/1467)
 Derbyshire Ambulance Service National Health Service Trust (Transfer of Trust Property) Order 1995 (S.I. 1995/1468)
 Calderdale Healthcare National Health Service Trust (Establishment) Amendment Order 1995 (S.I. 1995/1469)
 Road Vehicles (Registration and Licensing) (Amendment) Regulations 1995 (S.I. 1995/1470)
 Road Vehicles (Registration and Licensing) (Amendment) Regulations (Northern Ireland) 1995 (S.I. 1995/1471)
 Isles of Scilly Sea Fisheries District (Variation) Order 1995 (S.I. 1995/1472)
 Kent and Essex Sea Fisheries District (Variation) Order 1995 (S.I. 1995/1474)
 Police (Discipline) (Amendment) Regulations 1995 (S.I. 1995/1475)
 Roads (Transitional Powers) (Scotland) Order 1995 (S.I. 1995/1476)
 Coal Industry (Coal Mining Successor Companies Target Investment Limit) Order 1995 (S.I. 1995/1477)
 Cosmetic Products (Safety) Regulations 1995 (S.I. 1995/1478)
 Companies (Forms) (No. 2) Regulations 1995 (S.I. 1995/1479)
 Rheoliadau (Ffurflenni a Dogfenni Cymraeg) Cwmnïau (Rhif 2) 1995 (S.I. 1995/1480)
 Companies (Welsh Language Forms and Documents) (No.2) Regulations 1995 (S.I. 1995/1480)
 Hill Livestock (Compensatory Allowances) (Amendment) (No. 2) Regulations 1995 (S.I. 1995/1481)
 Cereal Seeds (Amendment) Regulations 1995 (S.I. 1995/1482)
 Pesticides (Maximum Residue Levels in Crops, Food and Feeding Stuffs) (Amendment) Regulations 1995 (S.I. 1995/1483)
 Goods Vehicles (Operators' Licences, Qualifications and Fees) (Amendment) Regulations 1995 (S.I. 1995/1488)
 Norwich Community Health Partnership National Health Service Trust (Transfer of Trust Property) Order 1995 (S.I. 1995/1489)
 Norfolk Mental Health Care National Health Service Trust (Transfer of Trust Property) Order 1995 (S.I. 1995/1490)
 Leicestershire Mental Health Service National Health Service Trust (Transfer of Trust Property) Order 1995 (S.I. 1995/1491)
 Bury Health Care National Health Service Trust (Transfer of Trust Property) Order 1995 (S.I. 1995/1492)
 Cumbria Ambulance Service National Health Service Trust (Transfer of Trust Property) Order 1995 (S.I. 1995/1493)
 North Lakeland Healthcare National Health Service Trust (Transfer of Trust Property) Order 1995 (S.I. 1995/1494)
 Value Added Tax (Tour Operators) (Amendment) Order 1995 (S.I. 1995/1495)
 Local Government Superannuation (Gratuities) Regulations 1995 (S.I. 1995/1497)

1501-1600

 Asian Development Bank (Extension of Limit on Guarantees) Order 1995 (S.I. 1995/1502)
 Asian Development Bank (Further Payments to Capital Stock) Order 1995 (S.I. 1995/1503)
 British Coal Corporation (Change of Quorum) Regulations 1995 (S.I. 1995/1506)
 Coal Industry Act 1994 (Commencement No. 6) and Membership of the British Coal Corporation (Appointed Day) Order 1995 (S.I. 1995/1507)
 Rheoliadau (Ffurflenni a Dogfenni Cymraeg) Cwmnïau (Rhif 3) 1995 (S.I. 1995/1508)
 Companies (Welsh Language Forms and Documents) (No.3) Regulations 1995 (S.I. 1995/1508)
 Companies (Disqualification Orders) (Amendment) Regulations 1995 (S.I. 1995/1509)
 Local Government Reorganisation (Wales) (Consequential Amendments No. 2) Order 1995 (S.I. 1995/1510)
 Motor Cycle (EC Type Approval) Regulations 1995 (S.I. 1995/1513)
 Pneumoconiosis etc. (Workers' Compensation) (Payment of Claims) (Amendment) Regulations 1995 (S.I. 1995/1514)
 Local Government (Qualifications of Assessors) (Scotland) Order 1995 (S.I. 1995/1515)
 Companies Act 1985 (Disclosure of Remuneration for Non-Audit Work) (Amendment) Regulations 1995 (S.I. 1995/1520)
 Greater Manchester Passenger Transport Authority (Increase in Number of Members) Order 1995 (S.I. 1995/1522)
 Local Authorities (Capital Finance) (Amendment) Regulations 1995 (S.I. 1995/1526)
 Fraserburgh Harbour Revision Order 1995 (S.I. 1995/1527)
 West Yorkshire Metropolitan Ambulance Service National Health Service Trust (Transfer of Trust Property) Order 1995 (S.I. 1995/1534)
 Financial Services Act 1986 (Investment Advertisements) (Exemptions) (No. 2) Order 1995 (S.I. 1995/1536)
 Public Offers of Securities Regulations 1995 (S.I. 1995/1537)
 Financial Services Act 1986 (Commencement) (No. 13) Order 1995 (S.I. 1995/1538)
 Personal Equity Plan (Amendment) Regulations 1995 (S.I. 1995/1539)
 Section 19 Minibus (Designated Bodies) (Amendment) Order 1995 (S.I. 1995/1540)
 Transport and Works (Assessment of Environmental Effects) Regulations 1995 (S.I. 1995/1541)
 Eggs (Marketing Standards) Regulations 1995 (S.I. 1995/1544)
 Council Tax Limitation (England) (Maximum Amounts) Order 1995 (S.I. 1995/1545)
 Double Taxation Relief (Manufactured Overseas Dividends) (Amendment) Regulations 1995 (S.I. 1995/1551)
 Education (Grant-maintained and Grant-maintained Special Schools) (Finance) (Amendment) Regulations 1995 (S.I. 1995/1554)
 Betting and Gaming Duties (Payment) Regulations 1995 (S.I. 1995/1555)
 Dwr Cymru Cyfyngedig (Pipelaying and Other Works) (Code of Practice) Order 1995 (S.I. 1995/1556)
 Food Protection (Emergency Prohibitions) (Paralytic Shellfish Poisoning) (No.3) Order 1995 (S.I. 1995/1560)
 Education (School Performance Information) (England) (Amendment) Regulations 1995 (S.I. 1995/1561)
 Northern Ireland (Emergency and Prevention of Terrorism Provisions) (Continuance) Order 1995 (S.I. 1995/1566)
 Offshore Installations (Safety Zones) (No. 2) Order 1995 (S.I. 1995/1567)
 Ridge Danyers College (Incorporation) Order 1995 (S.I. 1995/1568)
 Ridge Danyers College (Government) Regulations 1995 (S.I. 1995/1569)
 Social Security (Contributions) Amendment (No. 5) Regulations 1995 (S.I. 1995/1570)
 National Health Service (Fund-Holding Practices) (Scotland) Amendment Regulations 1995 (S.I. 1995/1571)
 Building (Procedure) (Scotland) Amendment Regulations 1995 (S.I. 1995/1572)
 Education (National Curriculum) (Exceptions) (Wales) Regulations 1995 (S.I. 1995/1574)
 Offshore Installations (Safety Zones) (No. 3) Order 1995 (S.I. 1995/1575)
 Fisheries and Aquaculture Structures (Grants) Regulations 1995 (S.I. 1995/1576)
 Local Government Act 1988 (Defined Activities) (Exemption) (Hart District Council) Order 1995 (S.I. 1995/1581)
 County Court (Amendment No. 2) Rules 1995 (S.I. 1995/1582)
 County Court (Forms) (Amendment No. 2) Rules 1995 (S.I. 1995/1583)
 Insurance Premium Tax (Amendment) Regulations 1995 (S.I. 1995/1587)
 Walsgrave Hospitals National Health Service Trust (Transfer of Trust Property) Order 1995 (S.I. 1995/1588)
 Kettering General Hospital National Health Service Trust (Transfer of Trust Property) Order 1995 (S.I. 1995/1589)
 Tavistock and Portman National Health Service Trust (Transfer of Trust Property) Order 1995 (S.I. 1995/1590)
 Companies Act 1989 (Commencement No. 16) Order 1995 (S.I. 1995/1591)
 A3 Trunk Road (Kingston Vale, Kingston upon Thames) (Prescribed Routes) Order 1995 (S.I. 1995/1593)
 Kent County Council (Hale Street Medway Bridge) Scheme 1994 Confirmation Instrument 1995 (S.I. 1995/1594)
 Act of Sederunt (Registration Appeal Court) 1995 (S.I. 1995/1596)
 A312 Trunk Road (The Parkway, Hounslow) (Prescribed Routes) Order 1995 (S.I. 1995/1597)
 Prison (Amendment) (No. 2) Rules 1995 (S.I. 1995/1598)
 Young Offender Institution (Amendment) (No. 2) Rules 1995 (S.I. 1995/1599)

1601-1700

 East Wiltshire Health Care National Health Service Trust (Transfer of Trust Property) Order 1995 (S.I. 1995/1602)
 Rockingham Forest National Health Service Trust (Transfer of Trust Property) Order 1995 (S.I. 1995/1603)
 Swindon and Marlborough National Health Service Trust (Transfer of Trust Property) Order 1995 (S.I. 1995/1604)
 Fishing Vessels (Safety Improvements) (Grants) Scheme 1995 (S.I. 1995/1609)
 Fishing Vessels (Decommissioning) Scheme 1995 (S.I. 1995/1610)
 Food Protection (Emergency Prohibitions) (Paralytic Shellfish Poisoning) (No.4) Order 1995 (S.I. 1995/1611)
 Personal Pension Schemes (Appropriate Schemes) Amendment Regulations 1995 (S.I. 1995/1612)
 Social Security (Income Support and Claims and Payments) Amendment Regulations 1995 (S.I. 1995/1613)
 Adoption (Designation of Overseas Adoptions) (Variation) (Scotland) Order 1995 (S.I. 1995/1614)
 Parliamentary Commissioner Order 1995 (S.I. 1995/1615)
 Child Abduction and Custody (Parties to Conventions) (Amendment) (No. 4) Order 1995 (S.I. 1995/1616)
 Consular Fees Order 1995 (S.I. 1995/1617)
 European Communities (Definition of Treaties) (Partnership and Co-operation Agreement between the European Communities and their Member States and the Russian Federation) Order 1995 (S.I. 1995/1618)
 European Communities (Definition of Treaties) (Partnership and Co-operation Agreement between the European Communities and their Member States, and Ukraine) Order 1995 (S.I. 1995/1619)
 Extradition (Drug Trafficking) (Falkland Islands and Gibraltar) Order 1995 (S.I. 1995/1620)
 South Georgia and South Sandwich Islands (Amendment) Order 1995 (S.I. 1995/1621)
 Armagh Observatory and Planetarium (Northern Ireland) Order 1995 (S.I. 1995/1622)
 Arts Council (Northern Ireland) Order 1995 (S.I. 1995/1623)
 European Convention on Extradition Order 1990 (Amendment) Order 1995 (S.I. 1995/1624)
Historic Monuments and Archaeological Objects (Northern Ireland) Order 1995 (S.I. 1995/1625)
 Parliamentary Constituencies (England) Order 1995 (S.I. 1995/1626)
 Ports (Amendment) (Northern Ireland) Order 1995 (S.I. 1995/1627)
 Education (Inspectors of Schools in Wales) Order 1995 (S.I. 1995/1628)
 Gas Appliances (Safety) Regulations 1995 (S.I. 1995/1629)
 Food Protection (Emergency Prohibitions) (Paralytic Shellfish Poisoning) Order 1995 Partial Revocation Order 1995 (S.I. 1995/1630)
 Rent Officers (Additional Functions) Order 1995 (S.I. 1995/1642)
 Rent Officers (Additional Functions) (Scotland) Order 1995 (S.I. 1995/1643)
 Housing Benefit (General) Amendment Regulations 1995 (S.I. 1995/1644)
 National Lottery Charities Board (Increase in Membership) Order 1995 (S.I. 1995/1645)
 Package Travel, Package Holidays and Package Tours (Amendment) Regulations 1995 (S.I. 1995/1648)
 Children (Allocation of Proceedings) (Amendment) Order 1995 (S.I. 1995/1649)
 Dudley Priority Health National Health ServiceTrust (Transfer of Trust Property) Order 1995 (S.I. 1995/1657)
 Lincolnshire County Council (B1003/A57 Rope Walk to Carholme Road Link, Lincoln, Fossdyke Navigation and Brayford Pool Bridge) Scheme 1995 Confirmation Instrument 1995 (S.I. 1995/1658)
 Buying Agency Trading Funds (Extension) Order 1995 (S.I. 1995/1665)
 Value Added Tax (Input Tax) (Amendment) (No. 3) Order 1995 (S.I. 1995/1666)
 Value Added Tax (Cars) (Amendment) (No. 2) Order 1995 (S.I. 1995/1667)
 Value Added Tax (Supply of Services) (Amendment) Order 1995 (S.I. 1995/1668)
 Gaming (Small Charges) (Amendment) Order 1995 (S.I. 1995/1669)
 Teachers' Superannuation (Scotland) Amendment Regulations 1995 (S.I. 1995/1670)
 Active Implantable Medical Devices (Amendment and Transitional Provisions) Regulations 1995 (S.I. 1995/1671)
 Education (Special Educational Needs) (Amendment) Regulations 1995 (S.I. 1995/1673)
 Conditional Fee Agreements Order 1995 (S.I. 1995/1674)
 Conditional Fee Agreements Regulations 1995 (S.I. 1995/1675)
 Commissioners for Oaths (Prescribed Bodies) Regulations 1995 (S.I. 1995/1676)
 Severn Bridge (Amendment) Regulations 1995 (S.I. 1995/1677)
 Non-Domestic Rating (Chargeable Amounts) (Amendment No. 2) Regulations 1995 (S.I. 1995/1678)
 Non-Domestic Rating (Police Authorities) Order 1995 (S.I. 1995/1679)
 Pensions Increase (Civil Service Compensation Scheme 1994) Regulations 1995 (S.I. 1995/1680)
 Pensions Increase (Pension Schemes for Derek Compton Lewis) Regulations 1995 (S.I. 1995/1681)
 Pensions Increase (Pension Scheme for Mr Allan David Green) Regulations 1995 (S.I. 1995/1682)
 Pensions Increase (Civil Service Supplementary (Earnings Cap) Pension Scheme 1994) Regulations 1995 (S.I. 1995/1683)
 Department of Transport (Fees) (Amendment) Order 1995 (S.I. 1995/1684)
 Education (Grant) (Bishop Perowne High School) Regulations 1995 (S.I. 1995/1688)
 A12 Trunk Road (Redbridge) (No. 1) Red Route Experimental Traffic Order 1995 (S.I. 1995/1692)
 A316 Trunk Road (Hounslow) Red Route Traffic Order 1995 (S.I. 1995/1693)
 A316 Trunk Road (Richmond) (No. 1) Red Route Experimental Traffic Order 1995 (S.I. 1995/1694)
 A12 Trunk Road (Redbridge) Red Route Experimental Traffic Order 1995 (S.I. 1995/1695)
 A1400 Trunk Road (Redbridge) Red Route Experimental Traffic Order 1995 (S.I. 1995/1696)
 A316 Trunk Road (Richmond) Red Route (Clearway) Traffic Order 1995 (S.I. 1995/1697)
 A316 Trunk Road (Hounslow) Red Route (Clearway) Traffic Order 1995 (S.I. 1995/1698)
 A406 Trunk Road (Newham and Barking and Dagenham) Red Route Experimental Traffic Order 1995 (S.I. 1995/1699)
 A13 Trunk Road (Barking and Dagenham) Red Route Experimental Traffic Order 1995 (S.I. 1995/1700)

1701-1800

 A13 Trunk Road (Newham) Red Route Experimental Traffic Order 1995 (S.I. 1995/1701)
 A10 Trunk Road (Haringey) Red Route Experimental Traffic Order 1995 (S.I. 1995/1702)
 A13 Trunk Road (Havering) Red Route Experimental Traffic Order 1995 (S.I. 1995/1703)
 Education (Funding for Teacher Training) Designation Order 1995 (S.I. 1995/1704)
 Education (Grants for Education Support and Training) (England) (Amendment) Regulations 1995 (S.I. 1995/1705)
 Football Spectators (Seating) Order 1995 (S.I. 1995/1706)
 Local Government Act 1988 (Defined Activities) (Exemption) (Allerdale Borough Council, St Edmundsbury Borough Council and Uttlesford District Council) Order 1995 (S.I. 1995/1707)
 Nitrate Sensitive Areas (Amendment) Regulations 1995 (S.I. 1995/1708)
 Royal Orthopaedic Hospital National Health Service Trust (Establishment) Amendment Order 1995 (S.I. 1995/1709)
 Acklam Sixth Form College, Middlesbrough and Kirby College of Further Education, Middlesbrough (Dissolution) Order 1995 (S.I. 1995/1710)
 Longlands College of Further Education, Middlesbrough and Marton Sixth Form College Middlesbrough (Dissolution) Order 1995 (S.I. 1995/1711)
 St Mary's Music School (Aided Places) Regulations 1995 (S.I. 1995/1712)
 Education (Assisted Places) (Scotland) Regulations 1995 (S.I. 1995/1713)
 Food Protection (Emergency Prohibitions) (Paralytic Shellfish Poisoning) (No.5) Order 1995 (S.I. 1995/1714)
 International Carriage of Perishable Foodstuffs (Amendment) Regulations 1995 (S.I. 1995/1716)
 INDUSTRIAL TRIBUNALS (ENFORCEMENT OF ORDERS UNDER THE CIVIL JURISDICTION AND JUDGMENTS ACT 1982) (SCOTLAND) REGULATIONS 1995 (S.I. 1995/1717)
 Foreign Companies (Execution of Documents) (Amendment) Regulations 1995 (S.I. 1995/1729)
 Insurance Companies (Taxation of Reinsurance Business) Regulations 1995 (S.I. 1995/1730)
 Mancunian Community Health National HealthService Trust (Transfer of Trust Property) (No. 2) Order 1995 (S.I. 1995/1731)
 South Manchester University Hospitals National Health Service Trust (Transfer of Trust Property) Order 1995 (S.I. 1995/1732)
 Tameside and Glossop Acute Services National Health Service Trust (Transfer of Trust Property) Order 1995 (S.I. 1995/1733)
 Tameside and Glossop Communityand Priority Services National Health Service Trust (Transfer of Trust Property) Order 1995 (S.I. 1995/1734)
 Gloucestershire Royal National Health Service Trust (Transfer of Trust Property) Order 1995 (S.I. 1995/1735)
 North Manchester Healthcare National Health Service Trust (Transfer of Trust Property) Order 1995 (S.I. 1995/1736)
 Food Protection (Emergency Prohibitions) (Paralytic Shellfish Poisoning) (No.6) Order 1995 (S.I. 1995/1737)
 Arable Area Payments Regulations 1995 (S.I. 1995/1738)
 Education Authority Bursaries (Scotland) Regulations 1995 (S.I. 1995/1739)
 Social Security Benefits (Miscellaneous Amendments) Regulations 1995 (S.I. 1995/1742)
 Education (School Teachers' Pay and Conditions) (No. 2) Order 1995 (S.I. 1995/1743)
 Cleveland (Further Provision) Order 1995 (S.I. 1995/1747)
 Local Government Changes for England (Miscellaneous Provision) Regulations 1995 (S.I. 1995/1748)
 Combined Probation Areas (Greater Manchester) Order 1995 (S.I. 1995/1749)
 Gaming (Small Charges) (Scotland) Variation Order 1995 (S.I. 1995/1750)
 Transcripts of Criminal Proceedings (Scotland) Amendment Order 1995 (S.I. 1995/1751)
 Training for Work (Scottish Enterprise and Highlands and Islands Enterprise Programmes) Order 1995 (S.I. 1995/1752)
 Equine Viral Arteritis Order 1995 (S.I. 1995/1755)
 Food Safety (General Food Hygiene) Regulations 1995 (S.I. 1995/1763)
 South Kent Community Healthcare National Health Service Trust (Transfer of Trust Property) Order 1995 (S.I. 1995/1766)
 Local Government Act 1988 (Defined Activities) (Exemption) (Allerdale Borough Council, St Edmundsbury Borough Council and Uttlesford District Council) Order 1995 (S.I. 1995/1767)
 Birmingham Heartlands Hospital National Health Service Trust (Transfer of Trust Property) Order 1995 (S.I. 1995/1768)
 Buckinghamshire (Borough of Milton Keynes) (Structural Change) Order 1995 (S.I. 1995/1769)
 East Sussex (Boroughs of Brighton and Hove) (Structural Change) Order 1995 (S.I. 1995/1770)
 Dorset (Boroughs of Poole and Bournemouth) (Structural Change) Order 1995 (S.I. 1995/1771)
 Durham (Borough of Darlington) (Structural Change) Order 1995 (S.I. 1995/1772)
 Derbyshire (City of Derby) (Structural Change) Order 1995 (S.I. 1995/1773)
 Wiltshire (Borough of Thamesdown) (Structural Change) Order 1995 (S.I. 1995/1774)
 Hampshire (Cities of Portsmouth and Southampton) (Structural Change) Order 1995 (S.I. 1995/1775)
 Bedfordshire (Borough of Luton) (Structural Change) Order 1995 (S.I. 1995/1776)
 Travellers' Reliefs (Fuel and Lubricants) Order 1995 (S.I. 1995/1777)
 Finance Act 1995 (Contractual Savings Schemes) (Appointed Day) Order 1995 (S.I. 1995/1778)
 Staffordshire (City of Stoke-on-Trent) (Structural and Boundary Changes) Order 1995 (S.I. 1995/1779)
 Training for Work (Miscellaneous Provisions) Order 1995 (S.I. 1995/1780)

1801-1900

 Social Security (Adjudication) Regulations 1995 (S.I. 1995/1801)
 Merchant Shipping and Fishing Vessels (Medical Stores) Regulations 1995 (S.I. 1995/1802)
 Merchant Shipping (Ships' Doctors) Regulations 1995 (S.I. 1995/1803)
 Units of Measurement Regulations 1995 (S.I. 1995/1804)
 County Council of Norfolk (Reconstruction of Welney Suspension Bridge) Scheme 1994 Confirmation Instrument 1995 (S.I. 1995/1805)
 Building Societies (Limits on Transactions with Directors) Order 1995 (S.I. 1995/1872)
 Building Societies (Non-Retail Funds and Deposits) (Limit on Election) Order 1995 (S.I. 1995/1873)
 Building Societies (Mergers) (Amendment) Regulations 1995 (S.I. 1995/1874)
 Act of Adjournal (Consolidation Amendment) (Supervised Release Orders) 1995 (S.I. 1995/1875)
 Act of Sederunt (Proceedings in the Sheriff Court under the Debtors (Scotland) Act 1987) (Amendment) 1995 (S.I. 1995/1876)
 Act of Sederunt (Consumer Credit Act 1974) 1985 (Amendment) 1995 (S.I. 1995/1877)
 Local Government (Transitional Provisions) (Scotland) Order 1995 (S.I. 1995/1878)
 Aberdeen and Grampian Tourist Board Scheme Order 1995 (S.I. 1995/1879)
 Angus and City of Dundee Tourist Board Scheme Order 1995 (S.I. 1995/1880)
 Argyll, the Isles, Loch Lomond, Stirling and Trossachs Tourist Board Scheme Order 1995 (S.I. 1995/1881)
 Ayrshire and Arran Tourist Board Scheme Order 1995 (S.I. 1995/1882)
 Dumfries and Galloway Tourist Board Scheme Order 1995 (S.I. 1995/1883)
 Edinburgh and Lothians Tourist Board Scheme Order 1995 (S.I. 1995/1884)
 Greater Glasgow and Clyde Valley Tourist Board Scheme Order 1995 (S.I. 1995/1885)
 Highlands of Scotland Tourist Board Scheme Order 1995 (S.I. 1995/1886)
 Kingdom of Fife Tourist Board Scheme Order 1995 (S.I. 1995/1887)
 Orkney Tourist Board Scheme Order 1995 (S.I. 1995/1888)
 Perthshire Tourist Board Scheme Order 1995 (S.I. 1995/1889)
 Scottish Borders Tourist Board Scheme Order 1995 (S.I. 1995/1890)
 Shetland Tourist Board Scheme Order 1995 (S.I. 1995/1891)
 Western Isles Tourist Board Scheme Order 1995 (S.I. 1995/1892)
 Merchant Shipping (Fees) Regulations 1995 (S.I. 1995/1893)
 Local Government (Relevant Date) (Scotland) Order 1995 (S.I. 1995/1894)
 Northern Ireland Act 1974 (Interim Period Extension) Order 1995 (S.I. 1995/1895)
 Northern Ireland (Emergency Provisions) Act 1991 (Codes of Practice) Order 1995 (S.I. 1995/1896)
 Civil Courts (Amendment) Order 1995 (S.I. 1995/1897)
 Local Government etc. (Scotland) Act 1994 (Commencement No.4) Order 1995 (S.I. 1995/1898)
 Merchant Shipping (Seamen's Documents) (Amendment) Regulations 1995 (S.I. 1995/1900)

1901-2000

 Education (School Performance Information) (Wales) Regulations 1995 (S.I. 1995/1904)
 Non-automatic Weighing Instruments (EEC Requirements) Regulations 1995 (S.I. 1995/1907)
 Magistrates' Courts (Forms) (Amendment) Rules 1995 (S.I. 1995/1909)
 Medway National Health Service Trust (Transfer of Trust Property) Order 1995 (S.I. 1995/1910)
 Kent Ambulance National Health Service Trust (Transfer of Trust Property) Order 1995 (S.I. 1995/1911)
 Mid Kent Healthcare National Health Service Trust (Transfer of Trust Property) Order 1995 (S.I. 1995/1912)
 North Kent Healthcare National Health Service Trust (Transfer of Trust Property) Order 1995 (S.I. 1995/1913)
 Royal Victoria Infirmary and Associated Hospitals National Health Service Trust (Transfer of Trust Property) Order 1995 (S.I. 1995/1914)
 Local Government Act 1988 (Competition) (Defined Activities) Order 1995 (S.I. 1995/1915)
 Friendly Societies (Modification of the Corporation Tax Acts) (Amendment) Regulations 1995 (S.I. 1995/1916)
 Broadcasting (Restrictions on the Holding of Licences) (Amendment) Order 1995 (S.I. 1995/1924)
 Broadcasting (Independent Productions) (Amendment) Order 1995 (S.I. 1995/1925)
 Ridge College, Stockport and Margaret Danyers College (Dissolution) Order 1995 (S.I. 1995/1927)
 Specified Bovine Offal Order 1995 (S.I. 1995/1928)
 Tax-exempt Special Savings Account (Amendment) Regulations 1995 (S.I. 1995/1929)
 Licensing (Sunday Hours) Act 1995 (Commencement) Order 1995 (S.I. 1995/1930)
 Fees in the Registers of Scotland Order 1995 (S.I. 1995/1945)
 A30 Trunk Road (Kennards House Junction Improvement and Slip Roads) Order 1995 (S.I. 1995/1946)
 Satellite Communications Services Regulations 1995 (S.I. 1995/1947)
 Local Government Elections (Changes to the Franchise and Qualification of Members) Regulations 1995 (S.I. 1995/1948)
 Waste Management Licensing (Amendment No. 2) Regulations 1995 (S.I. 1995/1950)
 Employment Protection (Increase of Limits) Order 1995 (S.I. 1995/1953)
 Housing Benefit (Permitted Totals) Order 1995 (S.I. 1995/1954)
 Bovine Offal (Prohibition) (England, Wales and Scotland) (Revocation) Regulations 1995 (S.I. 1995/1955)
 Offshore Installations (Safety Zones) (No. 4) Order 1995 (S.I. 1995/1956)
 Criminal Justice and Public Order Act 1994 (Commencement No. 8 and Transitional Provision) Order 1995 (S.I. 1995/1957)
 Criminal Justice Act 1993 (Commencement No. 9) Order 1995 (S.I. 1995/1958)
 Legal Officers (Annual Fees) Order 1995 (S.I. 1995/1959)
 Parochial Fees Order 1995 (S.I. 1995/1960)
 Ecclesiastical Judges and Legal Officers (Fees) Order 1995 (S.I. 1995/1961)
 European Convention on Extradition Order 1990 (Amendment) (No. 2) Order 1995 (S.I. 1995/1962)
 European Convention on CinematographicCo-production (Amendment) (No. 2) Order 1995 (S.I. 1995/1963)
 Army, Air Force and Naval Discipline Acts (Continuation) Order 1995 (S.I. 1995/1964)
 Naval Medical Compassionate Fund (Amendment) Order 1995 (S.I. 1995/1965)
 Misuse of Drugs Act 1971 (Modification) Order 1995 (S.I. 1995/1966)
 Drug Trafficking Act 1994 (Enforcement of Northern Ireland Confiscation Orders) Order 1995 (S.I. 1995/1967)
 Criminal Justice Act 1988 (Enforcement of Northern Ireland Confiscation Orders) Order 1995 (S.I. 1995/1968)
 Appropriation (No. 2) (Northern Ireland) Order 1995 (S.I. 1995/1969)
 Air Navigation (No. 2) Order 1995 (S.I. 1995/1970)
 Strathclyde Passenger Transport Area (Designation) Order 1995 (S.I. 1995/1971)
 Local Government Act 1988 (Defined Activities) (Competition) (Scotland) Amendment Regulations 1995 (S.I. 1995/1972)
 Local Government Act 1988 (Defined Activities) (Cleaning of Police Buildings) (England and Wales) Regulations 1995 (S.I. 1995/1973)
 Local Government Reorganisation (Capital Money) (Greater London) (Amendment) Order 1995 (S.I. 1995/1974)
 Value Added Tax (Refund of Tax) Order 1995 (S.I. 1995/1978)
 Venture Capital Trust Regulations 1995 (S.I. 1995/1979)
 Trade Union and Labour Relations (Northern Ireland) Order 1995 (S.I. 1995/1980)
 Local Authorities (Payment of Levy on Disposals) Regulations 1995 (S.I. 1995/1981)
 Local Authorities (Capital Finance and Approved Investments) (Amendment No. 2) Regulations 1995 (S.I. 1995/1982)
 Environment Act 1995 (Commencement No. 1) Order 1995 (S.I. 1995/1983)
 A87 Extension (Skye Bridge Crossing) Special Road Regulations 1995 (S.I. 1995/1984)
 Local Government Pension Scheme (Local Government Reorganisation in Wales) Regulations 1995 (S.I. 1995/1985)
 Contracting Out (Highway Functions) Order 1995 (S.I. 1995/1986)
 Legal Advice and Assistance (Scope) (Amendment) Regulations 1995 (S.I. 1995/1987)
 Export and Investment Guarantees (Limit on Foreign Currency Commitments) Order 1995 (S.I. 1995/1988)
 Plant Health (Forestry) (Great Britain) (Amendment) Order 1995 (S.I. 1995/1989)
 Safety of Sports Grounds (Designation) Order 1995 (S.I. 1995/1990)
 Dudley Group of Hospitals National Health ServiceTrust (Transfer of Trust Property) Order 1995 (S.I. 1995/1991)
 Furness Hospitals National Health Service Trust (Transfer of Trust Property) Order 1995 (S.I. 1995/1992)
 Severn National Health Service Trust (Transfer of Trust Property) Order 1995 (S.I. 1995/1993)
 South Cumbria Community and Mental Health National Health Service Trust (Transfer of Trust Property) Order 1995 (S.I. 1995/1994)
 Westmorland Hospitals National Health Service Trust (Transfer of Trust Property) Order 1995 (S.I. 1995/1995)

2001-2100

 Teachers' Superannuation (Amendment) Regulations 1995 (S.I. 1995/2004)
 Mines Miscellaneous Health and Safety Provisions Regulations 1995 (S.I. 1995/2005)
 Local Government (Publication of Staffing Information) (England) Regulations 1995 (S.I. 1995/2006)
 Western Isles Islands Council (Various Harbours Jurisdiction and Byelaws) Harbour Revision Order 1995 (S.I. 1995/2007)
 Children (Short-term Placements) (Miscellaneous Amendments) Regulations 1995 (S.I. 1995/2015)
 Education (Assisted Places) Regulations 1995 (S.I. 1995/2016)
 Education (Assisted Places) (Incidental Expenses) Regulations 1995 (S.I. 1995/2017)
 Education (Grants) (Music, Ballet and Choir Schools) Regulations 1995 (S.I. 1995/2018)
 Sex Discrimination (Designated Educational Establishments) (Revocation) Order 1995 (S.I. 1995/2019)
 Police (Amendment No. 2) Regulations 1995 (S.I. 1995/2020)
 Prisoners (Return to Custody) Act 1995 (Commencement) Order 1995 (S.I. 1995/2021)
 Church of England (Legal Aid) Rules 1995 (S.I. 1995/2034)
 Quarries Miscellaneous Health and Safety Provisions Regulations 1995 (S.I. 1995/2036)
 North East London Education Association Order 1995 (S.I. 1995/2037)
 Borehole Sites and Operations Regulations 1995 (S.I. 1995/2038)
 Warble Fly (Scotland) Amendment Order 1995 (S.I. 1995/2042)
 Town and Country Planning (Simplified Planning Zones) (Scotland) Regulations 1995 (S.I. 1995/2043)
 Town and Country Planning (Simplified Planning Zones) (Scotland) Order 1995 (S.I. 1995/2044)
 Planning and Compensation Act 1991 (Commencement No.18 and Transitional Provision) (Scotland) Order 1995 (S.I. 1995/2045)
 Food Protection (Emergency Prohibitions) (Paralytic Shellfish Poisoning) (No.6) Order 1995 Revocation Order 1995 (S.I. 1995/2046)
 Misuse of Drugs (Designation) (Variation) Order 1995 (S.I. 1995/2047)
 Misuse of Drugs (Amendment) Regulations 1995 (S.I. 1995/2048)
 Financial Markets and Insolvency (Money Market) Regulations 1995 (S.I. 1995/2049)
 Income Tax (Dealers in Securities) (Tradepoint) Regulations 1995 (S.I. 1995/2050)
 Stamp Duty Reserve Tax (Tradepoint) Regulations 1995 (S.I. 1995/2051)
 Income Tax (Manufactured Dividends) (Tradepoint) Regulations 1995 (S.I. 1995/2052)
 Mortgage Indemnities (Recognised Bodies) (No. 2) Order 1995 (S.I. 1995/2053)
 Repeal of Offensive Trades or Businesses Provisions Order 1995 (S.I. 1995/2054)
 Charities (Dormant Accounts) (Scotland) Regulations 1995 (S.I. 1995/2056)
 Dartford-Thurrock Crossing Tolls Order 1995 (S.I. 1995/2059)
 DARTFORD-THURROCK CROSSING (AMENDMENT) REGULATIONS 1995 (S.I. 1995/2060)
 Returning Officers (Parliamentary Constituencies) (England) Order 1995 (S.I. 1995/2061)
 Education (Further Education Institutions Information) (England) Regulations 1995 (S.I. 1995/2065)
 Housing (Right to Buy) (Priority of Charges) (No. 2) Order 1995 (S.I. 1995/2066)
 A43 Trunk Road (Whitfield Turn to Brackley Hatch Dualling) (Detrunking) Order 1995 (S.I. 1995/2067)
 A43 Trunk Road (Whitfield Turn to Brackley Hatch Dualling and Slip Roads) Order 1995 (S.I. 1995/2068)
 Education (School Information) (Wales) (Amendment) Regulations 1995 (S.I. 1995/2070)
 Education (National Curriculum) (Assessment Arrangements for the Core Subjects) (Key Stage 1) (England) Order 1995 (S.I. 1995/2071)
 Education (National Curriculum) (Assessment Arrangements for the Core Subjects) (Key Stage 2) (England) Order 1995 (S.I. 1995/2072)
 Education (National Curriculum) (Assessment Arrangements for the Core Subjects) (Key Stage 3) (England) Order 1995 (S.I. 1995/2073)
 Local Government Act 1988 (Security Work) (Exemption) (England) Order 1995 (S.I. 1995/2074)
 Motor Vehicles (Driving Licences) (Large Goods and Passenger-Carrying Vehicles) (Amendment) (No. 2) Regulations 1995 (S.I. 1995/2075)
 Motor Vehicles (Driving Licences) (Amendment) (No. 2) Regulations 1995 (S.I. 1995/2076)
 Education (Wyvern College, Salisbury) (Exemption from Pay and Conditions Orders) Order 1995 (S.I. 1995/2087)
 National Lottery etc. Act 1993 (Amendment of Section 23) Order 1995 (S.I. 1995/2088)
 Education (Pupil Registration) Regulations 1995 (S.I. 1995/2089)
 Education (School Attendance Order) Regulations 1995 (S.I. 1995/2090)
 Rhondda College (Dissolution) Order 1995 (S.I. 1995/2091)
 Companies (Summary Financial Statement) Regulations 1995 (S.I. 1995/2092)
 Patents Rules 1995 (S.I. 1995/2093)
 Nitrate Sensitive Areas (Amendment) (No. 2) Regulations 1995 (S.I. 1995/2095)
 Local Government Act 1988 (Competition) (Personnel Services) (Fire and Civil Defence Authorities) (England) Regulations 1995 (S.I. 1995/2100)

2101-2200

 Local Government Act 1988 (Competition) (Personnel Services) (England) Regulations 1995 (S.I. 1995/2101)
 Fire Services (Appointments and Promotion) (Amendment) Regulations 1995 (S.I. 1995/2109)
 Fire Services (Appointments and Promotion) (Scotland) Amendment Regulations 1995 (S.I. 1995/2110)
 London–Fishguard Trunk Road (A40) (Fishguard Western By-Pass) Order 1995 (S.I. 1995/2124)
 Agricultural Holdings (Units of Production) Order 1995 (S.I. 1995/2125)
 Street Works (Registers, Notices, Directions and Designations) (Amendment No. 3) Regulations 1995 (S.I. 1995/2128)
 Central Manchester Healthcare National Health Service Trust (Transfer of Trust Property) Order 1995 (S.I. 1995/2129)
 Police (Scotland) Amendment (No.3) Regulations 1995 (S.I. 1995/2131)
 Oswestry Light Railway Order 1995 (S.I. 1995/2142)
 Great Central (Nottingham) Railway Order 1995 (S.I. 1995/2143)
 Civil Aviation (Canadian Navigation Services) (Amendment) Regulations 1995 (S.I. 1995/2144)
 Swansea Bay Mussel Fishery Order 1995 (S.I. 1995/2145)
 Dolgellau to South of Birkenhead Trunk Road (A494) (Improvement at Nantclwyd Bridge) Order 1995 (S.I. 1995/2146)
 Medicines (Administration of Radioactive Substances) Amendment Regulations 1995 (S.I. 1995/2147)
 Wild Game Meat (Hygiene and Inspection) Regulations 1995 (S.I. 1995/2148)
 Greater Manchester Ambulance Service National Health Service Trust (Transfer of Trust Property) Order 1995 (S.I. 1995/2149)
 Warwickshire Ambulance Service National Health Service Trust (Transfer of Trust Property) Order 1995 (S.I. 1995/2150)
 Distraint by Collectors (Fees, Costs and Charges) (Amendment) Regulations 1995 (S.I. 1995/2151)
 Environmental Protection Act 1990 (Commencement No. 17) Order 1995 (S.I. 1995/2152)
 Social Security (Attendance and Disability Living Allowances) Amendment Regulations 1995 (S.I. 1995/2162)
 Patents (Fees) Rules 1995 (S.I. 1995/2164)
 Registered Designs (Fees) Rules 1995 (S.I. 1995/2165)
 M4 Motorway (Severn Bridge) (Speed Limit) Regulations 1995 (S.I. 1995/2168)
 Goods Vehicles (Licensing of Operators) Act 1995(Commencement and Transitional Provisions) Order 1995 (S.I. 1995/2181)
 A650 Trunk Road (Crossflatts Roundabout To Keighley Road Roundabout) (Detrunking) Order 1995 (S.I. 1995/2182)
 Social Security (Unemployment, Sickness and Invalidity Benefit) Amendment Regulations 1995 (S.I. 1995/2192)
 Conon Salmon Fishery District Designation Order 1995 (S.I. 1995/2193)
 Alness Salmon Fishery District Designation Order 1995 (S.I. 1995/2194)
 Land Drainage Improvement Works (Assessment of Environmental Effects) (Amendment) Regulations 1995 (S.I. 1995/2195)
 Food Safety (Temperature Control) Regulations 1995 (S.I. 1995/2200)

2201-2300

 County Council of The Royal County of Berkshire (A329(M) Loddon Bridge Connecting Road) Special Road Scheme 1995 Confirmation Instrument 1995 (S.I. 1995/2201)
 Rural Development Grants (Agriculture) (No. 2) Regulations 1995 (S.I. 1995/2202)
 Rules of the Supreme Court (Amendment) 1995 (S.I. 1995/2206)
 Education (National Curriculum) (Assessment Arrangements for English, Welsh, Mathematics and Science) (Key Stage 1) (Wales) Order 1995 (S.I. 1995/2207)
 Education (National Curriculum) (Assessment Arrangements for English, Welsh, Mathematics and Science) (Key Stage 2) (Wales) Order 1995 (S.I. 1995/2208)
 Education (National Curriculum) (Assessment Arrangements for English, Welsh, Mathematics and Science) (Key Stage 3) (Wales) Order 1995 (S.I. 1995/2209)
 Road Vehicles (Construction and Use) (Amendment) (No. 5) Regulations 1995 (S.I. 1995/2210)
 Aberdeen and Grampian Tourist Board Scheme Amendment Order 1995 (S.I. 1995/2211)
 Angus and City of Dundee Tourist Board Scheme Amendment Order 1995 (S.I. 1995/2212)
 Argyll, the Isles, Loch Lomond, Stirling and Trossachs Tourist Board Scheme Amendment Order 1995 (S.I. 1995/2213)
 Scottish Borders Tourist Board Scheme Amendment Order 1995 (S.I. 1995/2214)
 A12 Trunk Road (Eastern Avenue, Redbridge) (Prescribed Route) Order 1995 (S.I. 1995/2215)
 A3 Trunk Road (Beverley Way, Merton) (Prohibition of Left Turn) Order 1995 (S.I. 1995/2216)
 Ayrshire and Arran Tourist Board Scheme Amendment Order 1995 (S.I. 1995/2232)
 Dumfries and Galloway Tourist Board Scheme Amendment Order 1995 (S.I. 1995/2233)
 Edinburgh and Lothians Tourist Board Scheme Amendment Order 1995 (S.I. 1995/2234)
 Greater Glasgow and Clyde Valley Tourist Board Scheme Amendment Order 1995 (S.I. 1995/2235)
 Highlands of Scotland Tourist Board Scheme Amendment Order 1995 (S.I. 1995/2236)
 Kingdom of Fife Tourist Board Scheme Amendment Order 1995 (S.I. 1995/2237)
 Orkney Tourist Board Scheme Amendment Order 1995 (S.I. 1995/2238)
 Perthshire Tourist Board Scheme Amendment Order 1995 (S.I. 1995/2239)
 Shetland Tourist Board Scheme Amendment Order 1995 (S.I. 1995/2240)
 Western Isles Tourist Board Scheme Amendment Order 1995 (S.I. 1995/2241)
 A13 Trunk Road (Tower Hamlets) Red Route Experimental Traffic Order 1995 (S.I. 1995/2245)
 A406 Trunk Road (Enfield) Red Route Experimental Traffic Order 1995 (S.I. 1995/2246)
 Stonebridge Housing Action Trust (Transfer of Property) Order 1995 (S.I. 1995/2248)
 Local Government Pension Scheme (Pensionable Remuneration Amendment) Regulations 1995 (S.I. 1995/2249)
 Town and Country Planning (Environmental Assessment and Unauthorised Development) Regulations 1995 (S.I. 1995/2258)
 Town and Country Planning (Determination of Appeals by Appointed Persons) (Prescribed Classes) (Amendment) Regulations 1995 (S.I. 1995/2259)
 East Midlands Enterprise Zones (Mansfield) (Designation) Order 1995 (S.I. 1995/2260)
 Royal Scottish Academy of Music and Drama (Scotland) Order of Council 1995 (S.I. 1995/2261)
 Acquisition of Land (Rate of Interest after Entry) Regulations 1995 (S.I. 1995/2262)
 Income Support (General) Amendment and Transitional Regulations 1995 (S.I. 1995/2287)
 Gaming Act (Variation of Monetary Limits) (No. 2) Order 1995 (S.I. 1995/2288)
 Civil Aviation Authority (Economic Regulation of Airports) (Northern Ireland) Regulations 1995 (S.I. 1995/2294)
 Criminal Justice (Scotland) Act 1995 (Commencement No. 1, Transitional Provisions and Savings) Order 1995 (S.I. 1995/2295)

2301-2400

 Child Support Act 1995 (Commencement No. 1) Order 1995 (S.I. 1995/2302)
 Income-related Benefits Schemes and Social Security (Claims and Payments) (Miscellaneous Amendments) Regulations 1995 (S.I. 1995/2303)
 Residuary Body for Wales (Levies) Regulations 1995 (S.I. 1995/2306)
 National Health Service (Optical Charges and Payments) Amendment (No. 3) Regulations 1995 (S.I. 1995/2307)
 Legal Aid in Contempt of Court Proceedings (Scotland) Amendment Regulations 1995 (S.I. 1995/2319)
 Criminal Legal Aid (Scotland) Amendment Regulations 1995 (S.I. 1995/2320)
 Medicines Act 1968 (Amendment) Regulations 1995 (S.I. 1995/2321)
 Northern Birmingham Community Health National Health Service Trust (Transfer of Trust Property) Order 1995 (S.I. 1995/2322)
 Northern Birmingham Mental Health National Health Service Trust (Transfer of Trust Property) Order 1995 (S.I. 1995/2323)
 South Warwickshire Mental Health National Health Service Trust (Transfer of Trust Property) Order 1995 (S.I. 1995/2324)
 Fosse Health, Leicestershire Community National Health Service Trust (Transfer of Trust Property) Order 1995 (S.I. 1995/2325)
 Worcester Royal Infirmary National Health Service Trust (Transfer of Trust Property) Order 1995 (S.I. 1995/2326)
 City Hospital National Health Service Trust (Transfer of Trust Property) Order 1995 (S.I. 1995/2327)
 Motor Vehicles (EC Type Approval) (Amendment) Regulations 1995 (S.I. 1995/2328)
 Civil Aviation (Route Charges for Navigation Services) (Third Amendment) Regulations 1995 (S.I. 1995/2329)
 Customs Reviews and Appeals (Binding Tariff Information) Regulations 1995 (S.I. 1995/2351)
 National Health Service (Travelling Expenses and Remission of Charges) Amendment No. 2 Regulations 1995 (S.I. 1995/2352)
 Electricity Act 1989 (Disclosure of Information) (Director General of Electricity Supply for Northern Ireland) Order 1995 (S.I. 1995/2356)
 Construction Plant and Equipment (Harmonisation of Noise Emission Standards) (Amendment) Regulations 1995 (S.I. 1995/2357)
 Gaming Act (Variation of Monetary Limits) (Scotland) (No. 2) Order 1995 (S.I. 1995/2360)
 Rent Officers (Additional Functions) (Scotland) Amendment Order 1995 (S.I. 1995/2361)
 Offshore Installations (Safety Zones) (No. 5) Order 1995 (S.I. 1995/2363)
 Medicines (Products for Animal Use — Fees) Regulations 1995 (S.I. 1995/2364)
 Rent Officers (Additional Functions) (Amendment) Order 1995 (S.I. 1995/2365)
 Motor Cycle Noise Act 1987 (Commencement) Order 1995 (S.I. 1995/2367)
 Local Government Changes for England (School Reorganisation and Admissions) Regulations 1995 (S.I. 1995/2368)
 National Health Service (Optical Charges and Payments) (Scotland) Amendment (No.3) Regulations 1995 (S.I. 1995/2369)
 Motor Cycle Silencer and Exhaust Systems Regulations 1995 (S.I. 1995/2370)
 Magistrates' Courts Committees (Berkshire and Oxfordshire) Amalgamation Order 1995 (S.I. 1995/2372)
 Magistrates' Courts Committees (Bradford, Kirklees and Wakefield) Amalgamation Order 1995 (S.I. 1995/2373)
 Betting and Gaming Duties Act 1981 (Monetary Amounts) Order 1995 (S.I. 1995/2374)
 Magistrates' Courts Committees (Gwent, Mid Glamorgan and South Glamorgan) Amalgamation Order 1995 (S.I. 1995/2375)
 Magistrates' Courts Committees (Clwyd and Gwynedd) Amalgamation Order 1995 (S.I. 1995/2376)
 West Herts Community Health National Health Service Trust (Transfer of Trust Property) Order 1995 (S.I. 1995/2377)
 Mount Vernon and Watford Hospitals National Health Service Trust (Transfer of Trust Property) Order 1995 (S.I. 1995/2378)
 East Surrey Learning Disability and Mental Health Service National Health Service Trust (Change of Name) Order 1995 (S.I. 1995/2379)
 Shetland Islands Council (West Burrafirth) Harbour Revision Order 1995 (S.I. 1995/2380)
 National Health Service (Travelling Expenses and Remission of Charges) (Scotland) Amendment (No.2) Regulations 1995 (S.I. 1995/2381)
 Tay River Purification Board (Ordie Burn) Control Order 1995 (S.I. 1995/2382)
 Greater Manchester (Light Rapid Transit System) (Land Acquisition) Order 1995 (S.I. 1995/2383)
 Radioactive Substances (Hospitals) Exemption (Amendment) Order 1995 (S.I. 1995/2395)
 Veterinary Surgeons (Examination of Commonwealth and Foreign Candidates) (Amendment) Regulations Order of Council 1995 (S.I. 1995/2396)
 Veterinary Surgeons (Practice by Students) (Amendment) Regulations Order of Council 1995 (S.I. 1995/2397)

2401-2500

 Rhondda Health Care National Health Service Trust (Transfer of Trust Property) Order 1995 (S.I. 1995/2411)
 Food Protection (Emergency Prohibitions) (Paralytic Shellfish Poisoning) (Nos.2, 3 and 4) Orders 1995 Partial Revocation Order 1995 (S.I. 1995/2425)
 Spring Traps Approval Order 1995 (S.I. 1995/2427)
 Animals and Animal Products (Import and Export) Regulations 1995 (S.I. 1995/2428)
 West Midlands Ambulance Service National Health Service Trust (Transfer of Trust Property) Order 1995 (S.I. 1995/2434)
 Mental Health Services of Salford National Health Service Trust (Transfer of Trust Property) Order 1995 (S.I. 1995/2435)
 Taxes (Interest Rate) (Amendment) Regulations 1995 (S.I. 1995/2436)
 Third Country Fishing (Enforcement) (Amendment) Order 1995 (S.I. 1995/2437)
 Motor Vehicles (Tests) (Amendment) (No. 2) Regulations 1995 (S.I. 1995/2438)
 Animals (Post-Import Control) Order 1995 (S.I. 1995/2439)
 A20 Trunk Road (Greenwich) Red Route Experimental Traffic Order 1995 (S.I. 1995/2443)
 A2 Trunk Road (Bexley) Red Route Experimental Traffic Order 1995 (S.I. 1995/2444)
 A20 Trunk Road (Bexley and Bromley) Red Route Experimental Traffic Order 1995 (S.I. 1995/2445)
 Trafford Park Railway Order 1995 (S.I. 1995/2446)
 Glanusk Park (Crickhowell)-Llyswen Trunk Road (A479) (Dderw Improvement) Order 1995 (S.I. 1995/2448)
 Local Government Act 1988 (Defined Activities) (Cleaning of Police Buildings) (Exemption) (England and Wales) Order 1995 (S.I. 1995/2449)
 Electricity Generating Stations (Gas Contracts) Order 1995 (S.I. 1995/2450)
 Local Government Changes (Rent Act) Regulations 1995 (S.I. 1995/2451)
 London South Circular Trunk Road (A205) (Catford Hill, Lewisham) (Prescribed Routes) Order 1995 (S.I. 1995/2454)
 Valuation Timetable (Scotland) Amendment Order 1995 (S.I. 1995/2455)
 Local Government (Assistants for Political Groups) (Remuneration) Order 1995 (S.I. 1995/2456)
 National Health Service Supplies Authority (Transfer of Trust Property) Order 1995 (S.I. 1995/2457)
 Chinnor and Princes Risborough Railway (Extension) Order 1995 (S.I. 1995/2458)
 National Blood Authority (Transfer of Trust Property) Order 1995 (S.I. 1995/2459)
 Olympic Symbol etc. (Protection) Act 1995 (Commencement) Order 1995 (S.I. 1995/2472)
 Olympics Association Right (Appointment of Proprietor) Order 1995 (S.I. 1995/2473)
 Airport Byelaws (Designation) Order 1995 (S.I. 1995/2474)
 Aerodromes (Designation) (Detention and Sale of Aircraft) Order 1995 (S.I. 1995/2475)
 Bovine Embryo (Collection, Production and Transfer) Regulations 1995 (S.I. 1995/2478)
 Bovine Embryo (Collection, Production and Transfer) (Fees) Regulations 1995 (S.I. 1995/2479)
 Education (School Information) (England) (Amendment) Regulations 1995 (S.I. 1995/2480)
 Food Protection (Emergency Prohibitions) (Paralytic Shellfish Poisoning) Order 1995 and (Nos.4 and 5) Orders 1995 Revocation Order 1995 (S.I. 1995/2481)
Local Government Act 1988 (Defined Activities) (Specified Periods) (England) Regulations 1995 (S.I. 1995/2484)
 Medical Devices Fees Regulations 1995 (S.I. 1995/2487)
 Hallmarking (International Convention) (Amendment) Order 1995 (S.I. 1995/2488)
 Footwear (Indication of Composition) Labelling Regulations 1995 (S.I. 1995/2489)
 Local Government (Wales) Act 1994 (Commencement No. 5) Order 1995 (S.I. 1995/2490)
 Mid Glamorgan Ambulance National Health Service Trust (Transfer of Trust Property) Order 1995 (S.I. 1995/2491)
 Velindre Hospital National Health Service Trust (Transfer of Trust Property) Order 1995 (S.I. 1995/2492)
 Cardiff Community Healthcare National Health Service Trust (Transfer of Trust Property) Order 1995 (S.I. 1995/2493)
 University Dental Hospital National Health Service Trust (Transfer of Trust Property) Order 1995 (S.I. 1995/2494)
 Llandough Hospital and Community National Health Service Trust (Transfer of Trust Property) Order 1995 (S.I. 1995/2495)
 South and East Wales Ambulance National Health Service Trust (Transfer of Trust Property) (No.3) Order 1995 (S.I. 1995/2496)
 George Eliot Hospital National Health Service Trust (Transfer of Trust Property) Order 1995 (S.I. 1995/2497)
 Merchant Shipping (Reporting Requirements for Ships Carrying Dangerous or Polluting Goods) Regulations 1995 (S.I. 1995/2498)
 Local Authorities (Property Transfer) (Scotland) Order 1995 (S.I. 1995/2499)
 Local Government Property Commission (Scotland) Order 1995 (S.I. 1995/2500)

2501-2600

 Low Moor Tramway Light Railway Order 1995 (S.I. 1995/2501)
 Motorways Traffic (Scotland) Regulations 1995 (S.I. 1995/2507)
 Police (Discipline) (Amendment No. 2) Regulations 1995 (S.I. 1995/2517)
 Value Added Tax Regulations 1995 (S.I. 1995/2518)
 A2 Trunk Road (Bexley) Red Route (Clearway) Traffic Order 1995 (S.I. 1995/2519)
 A2 Trunk Road (Greenwich) Red Route (Clearway) Traffic Order 1995 (S.I. 1995/2520)
 A10 Trunk Road (Enfield) Red Route (Clearway) Traffic Order 1995 (S.I. 1995/2521)
 A12 Trunk Road (Havering) Red Route (Clearway) Traffic Order 1995 (S.I. 1995/2522)
 A12 Trunk Road (Redbridge and Barking and Dagenham) Red Route (Clearway) Traffic Order 1995 (S.I. 1995/2523)
 A13 Trunk Road (Barking and Dagenham and Newham) Red Route (Clearway) Traffic Order 1995 (S.I. 1995/2524)
 A13 Trunk Road (Havering) Red Route (Clearway) Traffic Order 1995 (S.I. 1995/2525)
 A13 Trunk Road (Newham) Red Route (Clearway) Traffic Order 1995 (S.I. 1995/2526)
 A20 Trunk Road (Bexley and Bromley) Red Route (Clearway) Traffic Order 1995 (S.I. 1995/2527)
 A20 Trunk Road (Greenwich) Red Route (Clearway) Traffic Order 1995 (S.I. 1995/2528)
 A102 Trunk Road (Greenwich) Red Route (Clearway) Traffic Order 1995 (S.I. 1995/2529)
 A102 Trunk Road (Tower Hamlets) Red Route (Clearway) Traffic Order 1995 (S.I. 1995/2530)
 A127 Trunk Road (Havering) Red Route (Clearway) Traffic Order 1995 (S.I. 1995/2531)
 A406 Trunk Road (Enfield) Red Route (Clearway) Traffic Order 1995 (S.I. 1995/2532)
 A406 Trunk Road (Redbridge) Red Route (Clearway) Traffic Order 1995 (S.I. 1995/2533)
 A406 Trunk Road (Newham, Redbridge and Barking and Dagenham) Red Route (Clearway) Traffic Order 1995 (S.I. 1995/2534)
 A406 Trunk Road (Waltham Forest) Red Route (Clearway) Traffic Order 1995 (S.I. 1995/2535)
 A 1400 Trunk Road (Redbridge) Red Route (Clearway) Traffic Order 1995 (S.I. 1995/2536)
 Local Government Act 1988 (Defined Activities) (Competition) (Amendment) (England) Regulations 1995 (S.I. 1995/2546)
 Land Registration (Scotland) Act 1979 (Commencement No.9) Order 1995 (S.I. 1995/2547)
 Pensions Act 1995 (Commencement No. 1) Order 1995 (S.I. 1995/2548)
 Artificial Insemination of Cattle (Animal Health) (England and Wales) (Amendment) Regulations 1995 (S.I. 1995/2549)
 Video Recordings (Labelling) (Amendment) Regulations 1995 (S.I. 1995/2550)
 Video Recordings (Review of Determinations) Order 1995 (S.I. 1995/2551)
 Combined Probation Areas (Northumbria) Order 1995 (S.I. 1995/2552)
 Combined Probation Areas (North Wales) Order 1995 (S.I. 1995/2553)
 Combined Areas (West Yorkshire) Order 1995 (S.I. 1995/2554)
 Outer London Probation Areas (North East London) Order 1995 (S.I. 1995/2555)
 Artificial Insemination of Cattle (Animal Health) (Scotland) Amendment Regulations 1995 (S.I. 1995/2556)
 Social Security (Credits) Amendment Regulations 1995 (S.I. 1995/2558)
 Social Security (Effect of Family Credit on Earnings Factors) Regulations 1995 (S.I. 1995/2559)
 Local Authorities (Calculation of Council Tax Base) (Wales) Regulations 1995 (S.I. 1995/2561)
 Local Authorities (Precepts) (Wales) Regulations 1995 (S.I. 1995/2562)
 Local Government Reorganisation (Wales) (Transitional Provisions No. 4) Order 1995 (S.I. 1995/2563)
 Surrey Heartlands National Health Service Trust (Transfer of Trust Property) Order 1995 (S.I. 1995/2581)
 Collective Redundancies and Transfer of Undertakings (Protection of Employment) (Amendment) Regulations 1995 (S.I. 1995/2587)
 Wireless Telegraphy (Citizens' Band and Amateur Apparatus) (Various Provisions) (Amendment) Order 1995 (S.I. 1995/2588)
 Valuation Joint Boards (Scotland) Order 1995 (S.I. 1995/2589)
 Education (Teachers) (Amendment) (No. 2) Regulations 1995 (S.I. 1995/2594)

2601-2700

 Social Security (Graduated Retirement Benefit) Amendment Regulations 1995 (S.I. 1995/2606)
 Measuring Instruments (EC Requirements) (Electrical Energy Meters) Regulations 1995 (S.I. 1995/2607)
 Crown Court (Amendment) Rules 1995 (S.I. 1995/2618)
 Magistrates' Courts (Amendment) (No. 2) Rules 1995 (S.I. 1995/2619)
 Social Fund Cold Weather Payments (General) Amendment Regulations 1995 (S.I. 1995/2620)
 Immigration (Transit Visa) (Amendment) Order 1995 (S.I. 1995/2621)
 Probation (Amendment) Rules 1995 (S.I. 1995/2622)
 Dearne Valley Enterprise Zones (Designation) Order 1995 (S.I. 1995/2624)
 East Midlands Enterprise Zones (North East Derbyshire) (Designation) Order 1995 (S.I. 1995/2625)
 Local Authorities (Goods and Services) (Public Bodies) (Meat Hygiene) Order 1995 (S.I. 1995/2626)
 County Court Fees (Amendment) Order 1995 (S.I. 1995/2627)
 Family Proceedings Fees (Amendment) Order 1995 (S.I. 1995/2628)
 Supreme Court Fees (Amendment) Order 1995 (S.I. 1995/2629)
 Mental Health Act Commission (Amendment) Regulations 1995 (S.I. 1995/2630)
 Amusement Machine Licence Duty Regulations 1995 (S.I. 1995/2631)
 North Eastern Combined Fire Services Area Administration Scheme Order 1995 (S.I. 1995/2632)
 Northern Combined Fire Services Area Administration Scheme Order 1995 (S.I. 1995/2633)
 South Eastern Combined Fire Services Area Administration Scheme Order 1995 (S.I. 1995/2634)
 Central Combined Fire Services Area Administration Scheme Order 1995 (S.I. 1995/2635)
 Mid and South Western Combined Fire Services Area Administration Scheme Order 1995 (S.I. 1995/2636)
 Mid Eastern Combined Fire Services Area Administration Scheme Order 1995 (S.I. 1995/2637)
 Central Scotland Combined Police Area Amalgamation Scheme Order 1995 (S.I. 1995/2638)
 Grampian Combined Police Area Amalgamation Scheme Order 1995 (S.I. 1995/2639)
 Lothian and Borders Combined Police Area Amalgamation Scheme Order 1995 (S.I. 1995/2640)
 Northern Combined Police Area Amalgamation Scheme Order 1995 (S.I. 1995/2641)
 Strathclyde Combined Police Area Amalgamation Scheme Order 1995 (S.I. 1995/2642)
 Tayside Combined Police Area Amalgamation Scheme Order 1995 (S.I. 1995/2643)
 Statutory Nuisance (Appeals) Regulations 1995 (S.I. 1995/2644)
 Blyth Harbour Act 1986 (Amendment) Order 1995 (S.I. 1995/2645)
 Health and Safety (Fees) Regulations 1995 (S.I. 1995/2646)
 Judicial Pensions (Guaranteed Minimum Pension etc.) Order 1995 (S.I. 1995/2647)
 Pensions Commutation (Amendment) Regulations 1995 (S.I. 1995/2648)
 Environment Act 1995 (Commencement No.2) Order 1995 (S.I. 1995/2649)
 Proceeds of Crime Act 1995 (Commencement) Order 1995 (S.I. 1995/2650)
 Marketing of Ornamental Plant Material Regulations 1995 (S.I. 1995/2651)
 Marketing of Vegetable Plant Material Regulations 1995 (S.I. 1995/2652)
 Marketing of Fruit Plant Material Regulations 1995 (S.I. 1995/2653)
 Protection of Wrecks (Designation No.1) Order 1995 (S.I. 1995/2654)
 Plant Variety Rights Office (Extension of Functions) Regulations 1995 (S.I. 1995/2655)
 River Nith Salmon Fishery District (Baits and Lures) Regulations 1995 (S.I. 1995/2682)
 River Arkaig, Loch Arkaig and Associated Waters Protection Order 1995 (S.I. 1995/2683)
 A10 Trunk Road (Enfield and Haringey) Red Route (Clearway) Traffic Order 1995 (S.I. 1995/2684)
 A23 Trunk Road (Croydon) Red Route (Bus Lanes) Experimental Traffic Order 1995 (S.I. 1995/2685)
 A23 Trunk Road (Croydon) Red Route (PrescribedRoute No.1) Experimental Traffic Order 1995 (S.I. 1995/2686)
 A23 Trunk Road (Croydon) Red RouteExperimental Traffic Order 1995 (S.I. 1995/2687)
 A205 Trunk Road (Richmond) Temporary Restriction of Traffic Order 1995 (S.I. 1995/2688)
 A23 Trunk Road (Croydon) Red Route (Clearway)Experimental Traffic Order 1995 (S.I. 1995/2689)
 Cheshire Community Healthcare National Health Service Trust (Transfer of Trust Property) Order 1995 (S.I. 1995/2691)
 Charities Act 1993 (Commencement and Transitional Provisions) Order 1995 (S.I. 1995/2695)
 Charities Act 1993 (Substitution of Sums) Order 1995 S.I. 1995/2696)
 Kent Ambulance National Health Service Trust (Establishment) Amendment Order 1995 (S.I. 1995/2697)
 West Cheshire National Health Service Trust (Transfer of Trust Property) Order 1995 (S.I. 1995/2698)
 Social Security (Canada) Order 1995 (S.I. 1995/2699)
 Air Navigation (Hong Kong) Order 1995 (S.I. 1995/2700)

2701-2800

 Air Navigation (Overseas Territories) (Amendment) Order 1995 (S.I. 1995/2701)
 Child Support (Northern Ireland) Order 1995 (S.I. 1995/2702)
 European Convention on Extradition Order 1990 (Amendment) (No. 3) Order 1995 (S.I. 1995/2703)
 Health and Personal Social Services (Amendment) (Northern Ireland) Order 1995 (S.I. 1995/2704)
 Jobseekers (Northern Ireland) Order 1995 (S.I. 1995/2705)
 Double Taxation Relief (Taxes on Income) (Belarus) Order 1995 (S.I. 1995/2706)
 Double Taxation Relief (Taxes on Income) (Bolivia) Order 1995 (S.I. 1995/2707)
 Reciprocal Enforcement of Foreign Judgments (Canada) (Amendment) Order 1995 (S.I. 1995/2708)
 Reciprocal Enforcement of Maintenance Orders (United States of America) Order 1995 (S.I. 1995/2709)
 Civil Aviation (Canadian Navigation Services) (Second Amendment) Regulations 1995 (S.I. 1995/2713)
 Finance Act 1993, section 11, (Appointed Day) Order 1995 (S.I. 1995/2715)
 Other Fuel Substitutes (Rates of Excise Duty etc.) Order 1995 (S.I. 1995/2716)
 Other Fuel Substitutes (Payment of Excise Duty etc.) Regulations 1995 (S.I. 1995/2717)
 Housing (Welfare Services) (Wales) Order 1995 (S.I. 1995/2720)
 Companies Act 1989 Part II (Consequential Amendment) (No. 2) Regulations 1995 (S.I. 1995/2723)
 Charities (Accounts and Reports) Regulations 1995 (S.I. 1995/2724)
 Employment Code of Practice (Industrial Action Ballots and Notice to Employers) Order 1995 (S.I. 1995/2729)
 European Convention on Cinematographic Co-production (Amendment) (No. 3) Order 1995 (S.I. 1995/2730)
 National Health Service (Charges for Drugsand Appliances) Amendment (No. 2) Regulations 1995 (S.I. 1995/2737)
 East Midlands Enterprise Zones (Bassetlaw)(Designation) Order 1995 (S.I. 1995/2738)
 National Health Service (Charges for Drugs and Appliances) (Scotland) Amendment (No.2) Regulations 1995 (S.I. 1995/2739)
 Antarctic (Amendment) Regulations 1995 (S.I. 1995/2741)
 Environmental Protection (Determination of Enforcing Authority Etc.) (Scotland) Amendment Regulations 1995 (S.I. 1995/2742)
 A1 Trunk Road (Islington) Red Route Traffic Order 1993 Experimental Variation Order 1995 (S.I. 1995/2743)
 A205 Trunk Road (Richmond and Wandsworth) Red Route Experimental Traffic Order 1995 Amendment Order 1995. S.I. 1995/2744)
 A205 Trunk Road (Upper Richmond Road West) Red Route (Prescribed Route No.1) Experimental Traffic Order 1995 (S.I. 1995/2746)
 St. Paul's Road and Corsica Street (Islington) Temporary Prohibition of Traffic Order 1995 (S.I. 1995/2747)
 Antarctic Act 1994 (Commencement) Order 1995 (S.I. 1995/2748)
 Kidderminster Health Care National Health Service Trust (Transfer of Trust Property) Order 1995 (S.I. 1995/2749)
 Public Telecommunication System Designation (Orange Personal Communications Services Limited) Order 1995 (S.I. 1995/2750)
 East Midlands Enterprise Zones (Ashfield) (Designation) Order 1995 (S.I. 1995/2758)
 Environment Act 1995 (Commencement No. 3) Order 1995 (S.I. 1995/2765)
 Local Government (Application of Enactments) (Scotland) (No.2) Order 1995 (S.I. 1995/2766)
 Control of Dogs on Roads Orders (Procedure) (England and Wales) Regulations 1995 (S.I. 1995/2767)
 Police Federation (Amendment) Regulations 1995 (S.I. 1995/2768)
 Traffic Signs General (Amendment) Directions 1995 (S.I. 1995/2769)
 Hill Livestock (Compensatory Allowances) (Amendment) (No. 3) Regulations 1995 (S.I. 1995/2778)
 Sheep Annual Premium (Amendment) Regulations 1995 (S.I. 1995/2779)
 Arable Area Payments (Amendment) Regulations 1995 (S.I. 1995/2780)
 Trafford Healthcare National Health Service Trust (Transfer of Trust Property) (No. 2) Order 1995 (S.I. 1995/2781)
 Approval of Codes of Management Practice (Residential Property) Order 1995 (S.I. 1995/2782)
 National Health Service Trusts (Originating Capital Debt) (Wales) (No. 2) Order 1995 (S.I. 1995/2783)
 General Medical Council (Registration (Fees) (Amendment) Regulations) Order of Council 1995 (S.I. 1995/2786)
 Children (Scotland) Act 1995 (Commencement No.1) Order 1995 (S.I. 1995/2787)
 Acquisition of Land (Rate of Interest after Entry) (Scotland) Regulations 1995 (S.I. 1995/2791)
 Income-related Benefits Schemes Amendment (No. 2) Regulations 1995 (S.I. 1995/2792)
 Housing Benefit (Permitted Totals) and Council Tax Benefit (Permitted Total) (Pensions for War Widows) Amendment Order 1995 (S.I. 1995/2793)
 Local Government Act 1988 (Sports and Leisure Management, Cleaning of Buildings and Repair and Maintenance of Vehicles) (Exemption) Order 1995 (S.I. 1995/2794)
 Offshore Installations (Safety Zones) (No. 6) Order 1995 (S.I. 1995/2795)
 Local Government Changes For England (Property Transfer and Transitional Payments) (Amendment) Regulations 1995 (S.I. 1995/2796)
 Gwent Community Health National Health Service Trust (Establishment) Amendment Order 1995 (S.I. 1995/2797)
 Harrogate (Parishes) Order 1995 (S.I. 1995/2799)
 National Health Service Litigation Authority (Establishment and Constitution) Order 1995 (S.I. 1995/2800)

2801-2900

 National Health Service Litigation Authority Regulations 1995 (S.I. 1995/2801)
 Magistrates' Courts (Reciprocal Enforcement of Maintenance Orders) (United States of America) Rules 1995 (S.I. 1995/2802)
 National Park Authorities (Wales) Order 1995 (S.I. 1995/2803)
 Medicines (Exemption from Licences) (Clinical Trials) Order 1995 (S.I. 1995/2808)
 Medicines (Exemption from Licences and Certificates) (Clinical Trials) Order 1995 (S.I. 1995/2809)
 Morriston Hospital National Health Service Trust (Transfer of Trust Property) (No. 2) Order 1995 (S.I. 1995/2811)
 East Durham Enterprise Zones(Designation) Order 1995 (S.I. 1995/2812)
 Local Government Act 1988 (Competition) (Information Technology) (England) Regulations 1995 (S.I. 1995/2813)
 Teachers' Superannuation (Additional Voluntary Contributions) (Scotland) Regulations 1995 (S.I. 1995/2814)
 Lottery Duty (Instant Chances) Regulations 1995 (S.I. 1995/2815)
 Boundary Bridges (Wales) (Appointed Day) Order 1995 (S.I. 1995/2816)
 Housing (Change of Landlord) (Payment of Disposal Cost by Instalments) (Amendment No. 2) Regulations 1995 (S.I. 1995/2823)
 Wildlife and Countryside Act 1981 (Amendment) Regulations 1995 (S.I. 1995/2825)
 Deregulation and Contracting Out Act 1994 (Commencement No. 4 and Transitional Provisions) Order 1995 (S.I. 1995/2835)
 Meat (Hygiene, Inspection and Examinations for Residues) (Charges) (Amendment) Regulations 1995 (S.I. 1995/2836)
 Local Government Reorganisation (Compensation for Loss of Remuneration) Regulations 1995 (S.I. 1995/2837)
 County Court (Amendment No. 3) Rules 1995 (S.I. 1995/2838)
 County Court (Forms) (Amendment No. 3) Rules 1995 (S.I. 1995/2839)
 Curfew Order (Responsible Officer) (Berkshire, Greater Manchester and Norfolk) Order 1995 (S.I. 1995/2840)
 Export Refunds (Administrative Penalties) (Rate of Interest) Regulations 1995 (S.I. 1995/2861)
 Local Government Changes for England (Finance) (Amendment) Regulations 1995 (S.I. 1995/2862)
 Town and Country Planning (Minerals) Regulations 1995 (S.I. 1995/2863)
 Police Areas (Wales) Order 1995 (S.I. 1995/2864)
 Local Government (Compensation for Reduction of Remuneration on Reorganisation) (Scotland) Regulations 1995 (S.I. 1995/2865)
 Local Government etc. (Scotland) Act 1994 (Commencement No.5) Order 1995 (S.I. 1995/2866)
 Parliamentary Pensions (Amendment) Regulations 1995 (S.I. 1995/2867)
 Housing Benefit (General) Amendment (No.2) Regulations 1995 (S.I. 1995/2868)
 Goods Vehicles (Licensing of Operators) Regulations 1995 (S.I. 1995/2869)
 Escape and Rescue from Mines Regulations 1995 (S.I. 1995/2870)
 Habitat (Salt-Marsh) (Amendment) Regulations 1995 (S.I. 1995/2871)
 Seed Potatoes originating in the Netherlands (Notification) (Scotland) Order 1995 (S.I. 1995/2874)
 Christie Hospital National Health Service Trust (Transfer of Trust Property) Order 1995 (S.I. 1995/2875)
 Gibraltar Point (Area of Special Protection) Order 1995 (S.I. 1995/2876)
 Tribunals And Inquiries (Antarctic Act Tribunal) Order 1995 (S.I. 1995/2877)
 Diligence against Earnings (Variation) (Scotland) Regulations 1995 (S.I. 1995/2878)
 Trunk Road (A3) (Robin Hood Way Service Road, Kingston upon Thames) (Restriction of Entry) Order 1982 (Variation) Order 1995 (S.I. 1995/2879)
 Sale of Registration Marks Regulations 1995 (S.I. 1995/2880)
 Local Government Changes for England (Collection Fund Surpluses and Deficits) Regulations 1995 (S.I. 1995/2889)
 Habitat (Salt-Marsh) (Correction to Amendment) Regulations 1995 (S.I. 1995/2891)
 Finance Act 1995, section 20, (Appointed Day) Order 1995 (S.I. 1995/2892)
 Revenue Traders (Accounts and Records) (Amendment) Regulations 1995 (S.I. 1995/2893)
 Local Government Changes For England (Designation of Authorities) Order 1995 (S.I. 1995/2894)
 Local Government Changes for England (Payments to Designated Authorities) (Minimum Revenue Provision) Regulations 1995 (S.I. 1995/2895)
 Sporting Grounds and Sporting Events (Designation) (Scotland) Amendment Order 1995 (S.I. 1995/2896)
 Rules of the Supreme Court (Amendment No.2) 1995 (S.I. 1995/2897)
 Bristol Development Corporation (Planning Functions) Order 1995 (S.I. 1995/2899)
 Bristol Development Corporation (Transfer of Property, Rights and Liabilities) Order 1995 (S.I. 1995/2900)

2901-3000

 Local Government Act 1988 (Defined Activities) (Exemption) (Fire Services) (England and Wales) Order 1995 (S.I. 1995/2901)
 Taxation of Income from Land (Non-residents) Regulations 1995 (S.I. 1995/2902)
 Insurance Brokers (Registration) Act 1977 (Amendment) Order 1995 (S.I. 1995/2906)
 Child Support Commissioners (Procedure) (Amendment) Regulations 1995 (S.I. 1995/2907)
 Public Service Vehicles (Operators' Licences) Regulations 1995 (S.I. 1995/2908)
 Public Service Vehicles (Operators' Licences) (Fees) Regulations 1995 (S.I. 1995/2909)
 Local Authorities (Funds) (England) (Amendment) Regulations 1995 (S.I. 1995/2910)
 Products of Animal Origin (Import and Export) (Amendment) Regulations 1995 (S.I. 1995/2911)
 Registered Designs Rules 1995 (S.I. 1995/2912)
 Registered Designs (Fees) (No. 2) Rules 1995 (S.I. 1995/2913)
 Consumer Credit (Exempt Agreements) (Amendment) (No. 2) Order 1995 (S.I. 1995/2914)
 Local Government Act 1988 (Defined Activities) (Exemption) (Stockton-on-Tees Borough Council) Order 1995 (S.I. 1995/2915)
 Local Government Act 1988 (Competition) (Financial Services) (England) Regulations 1995 (S.I. 1995/2916)
 Foreign Satellite Service Proscription Order 1995 (S.I. 1995/2917)
 Animal Health Orders (Divisional Veterinary Manager Amendment) Order 1995 (S.I. 1995/2922)
 Health and Safety Information for Employees (Modifications and Repeals) Regulations 1995 (S.I. 1995/2923)
 Social Security (Income Support, Claims and Payments and Adjudication) Amendment Regulations 1995 (S.I. 1995/2927)
 Immigration (Registration with Police) (Amendment) Regulations 1995 (S.I. 1995/2928)
 Plant Health (Great Britain) (Amendment) (No.2) Order 1995 (S.I. 1995/2929)
 Road Traffic (Special Parking Area) (London Borough of Croydon) (Amendment) Order 1995 (S.I. 1995/2930)
 Income and Corporation Taxes Act 1988, section 51A, (Appointed Day) Order 1995 (S.I. 1995/2932)
 Finance Act 1995, section 82, (Appointed Day) Order 1995 (S.I. 1995/2933)
 Income Tax (Gilt-edged Securities) (Gross Payments of Interest) Regulations 1995 (S.I. 1995/2934)
 Social Security (Invalid Care Allowance) Amendment Regulations 1995 (S.I. 1995/2935)
 Civil Aviation (Aerial Advertising) Regulations 1995 (S.I. 1995/2943)
 Sole, Plaice, Cod and Haddock (Specified Sea Areas) (Prohibition of Fishing) Order 1995 (S.I. 1995/2944)
 Northern Ireland (Remission of Sentences) Act 1995 (Commencement) Order 1995 (S.I. 1995/2945)
 Statistics of Trade (Customs and Excise) (Amendment) Regulations 1995 (S.I. 1995/2946)
 Plant Breeders' Rights (Fees) (Amendment) (No. 2) Regulations 1995 (S.I. 1995/2947)
 Environment Act 1995 (Commencement No. 4 and Saving Provisions) Order 1995 (S.I. 1995/2950)
 Combined Probation Areas (Hertfordshire) Order 1995 (S.I. 1995/2951)
 Forge Lane, Horbury Level Crossing Order 1995 (S.I. 1995/2952)
 Local Government Pension Scheme (Augmentation) Regulations 1995 (S.I. 1995/2953)
 County Council of Staffordshire (Trent and Mersey Canal) Bridge Scheme 1994 Confirmation Instrument 1995 (S.I. 1995/2956)
 Stockport Healthcare National Health Service Trust (Transfer of Trust Property) Order 1995 (S.I. 1995/2958)
 Stockport Acute Services National Health Service Trust (Transfer of Trust Property) Order 1995 (S.I. 1995/2959)
 Colleges of Further Education (Changes of Name) (Scotland) Order 1995 (S.I. 1995/2960)
 Judicial Pensions (Contributions) (Amendment) Regulations 1995 (S.I. 1995/2961)
 Land Registration (District Registries) Order 1995 (S.I. 1995/2962)
 Landlord and Tenant (Covenants) Act 1995 (Commencement) Order 1995 (S.I. 1995/2963)
 Landlord and Tenant (Covenants) Act 1995 (Notices) Regulations 1995 (S.I. 1995/2964)
 A30 Trunk Road (Great South West Road, Hounslow) (Temporary Restriction of Traffic) Order 1995 (S.I. 1995/2965)
 A41 Trunk Road (Baker Street) (Temporary Restriction of Traffic) Order 1995 (S.I. 1995/2966)
 A501 Trunk Road (Fitzroy Street) (Temporary Restriction of Traffic) Order 1995 (S.I. 1995/2967)
 A501 Trunk Road (Marylebone Road/Osnaburgh Street) (Temporary Restriction of Traffic) Order 1995 (S.I. 1995/2968)
 A501 Trunk Road (North Gower Street) (Temporary Restriction of Traffic) Order 1995 (S.I. 1995/2969)
 Western Isles Islands Council (Leverburgh) Harbour Revision Order 1995 (S.I. 1995/2971)
 European Communities (Designation) (No. 3) Order 1995 (S.I. 1995/2983)
 Ministerial and other Salaries Order 1995 (S.I. 1995/2984)
 Transfer of Functions (Science) Order 1995 (S.I. 1995/2985)
 Transfer of Functions (Education and Employment) Order 1995 (S.I. 1995/2986)
 Copyright (Application to Other Countries) (Amendment) Order 1995 (S.I. 1995/2987)
 Designs (Convention Countries) (Amendment) Order 1995 (S.I. 1995/2988)
 Patents (Convention Countries) (Amendment) Order 1995 (S.I. 1995/2989)
 Performances (Reciprocal Protection) (Convention Countries) Order 1995 (S.I. 1995/2990)
 Financial Provisions (Northern Ireland) Order 1995 (S.I. 1995/2991)
 Parliamentary Constituencies (Northern Ireland) Order 1995 (S.I. 1995/2992)
 Police (Amendment) (Northern Ireland) Order 1995 (S.I. 1995/2993)
 Road Traffic (Northern Ireland) Order 1995 (S.I. 1995/2994)
 Transfer of Functions (European Parliamentary Pay and Pensions) Order 1995 (S.I. 1995/2995)
 Local Government Act 1988 (Defined Activities, Exemptions) (Wales) (Amendment) Order 1995 (S.I. 1995/2996)
 Trade Marks (Claims to Priority from Relevant Countries) (Amendment) Order 1995 (S.I. 1995/2997)
 Exempt Charities Order 1995 (S.I. 1995/2998)
 Goods Vehicles (Licensing of Operators) (Fees) Regulations 1995 (S.I. 1995/3000)

3001-3100

 Police (Scotland) Amendment (No.4) Regulations 1995 (S.I. 1995/3001)
 Designation of Structure Plan Areas (Scotland) Order 1995 (S.I. 1995/3002)
 Police and Magistrates' Courts Act 1994 (Commencement No.9 and Amendment) Order 1995 (S.I. 1995/3003)
 Potatoes Originating in the Netherlands Order 1995 (S.I. 1995/3018)
 National Park Authorities (Levies) (Wales) Regulations 1995 (S.I. 1995/3019)
 Occupational Pensions (Revaluation) Order 1995 (S.I. 1995/3021)
 Company and Business Names (Amendment) Regulations 1995 (S.I. 1995/3022)
 Dundee Port Authority Transfer Scheme 1995 Confirmation Order 1995 (S.I. 1995/3023)
 Soft Fruit Plants (Scotland) Revocation Order 1995 (S.I. 1995/3024)
 Police Grant (Scotland) Amendment Order 1995 (S.I. 1995/3025)
 Strathclyde Passenger Transport Authority (Constitution, Membership and Transitional and Consequential Provisions) Order 1995 (S.I. 1995/3026)
 National Blood Authority (Transfer of Trust Property) (No. 2) Order 1995 (S.I. 1995/3028)
 Medicines (Pharmacies) (Applications for Registration and Fees) Amendment Regulations 1995 (S.I. 1995/3029)
 Income Tax (Indexation) Order 1995 (S.I. 1995/3031)
 Inheritance Tax (Indexation) Order 1995 (S.I. 1995/3032)
 Capital Gains Tax (Annual Exempt Amount) Order 1995 (S.I. 1995/3033)
 Retirement Benefits Schemes (Indexation of Earnings Cap) Order 1995 (S.I. 1995/3034)
 Income Tax (Cash Equivalents of Car Fuel Benefits) Order 1995 (S.I. 1995/3035)
 Manufactured Payments and Transfer of Securities (Tax Relief) Regulations 1995 (S.I. 1995/3036)
 Value Added Tax (Increase of Registration Limits) Order 1995 (S.I. 1995/3037)
 Value Added Tax (Place of Supply of Services) (Amendment) Order 1995 (S.I. 1995/3038)
 Value Added Tax (Ships and Aircraft) Order 1995 (S.I. 1995/3039)
 Value Added Tax (Increase of Consideration for Fuel) Order 1995 (S.I. 1995/3040)
 Value Added Tax (Tax Free Shops) Order 1995 (S.I. 1995/3041)
 Value Added Tax (Treatment of Transactions) (Trading Stamps) Order 1995 (S.I. 1995/3042)
 Value Added Tax (Trading Stamps) Regulations 1995 (S.I. 1995/3043)
 Travellers' Allowances Amendment Order 1995 (S.I. 1995/3044)
 Annual Close Time (River Eachaig Salmon Fishery District) Order 1995 (S.I. 1995/3047)
 Town and Country Planning (Limit of Annual Value) (Scotland) Order 1995 (S.I. 1995/3048)
 Road Vehicles (Construction and Use) (Amendment) (No. 6) Regulations 1995 (S.I. 1995/3051)
 Motor Vehicles (Authorisation of Special Types) (Amendment) Order 1995 (S.I. 1995/3052)
 National Assistance (Assessment of Resources) (Amendment No. 2) Regulations 1995 (S.I. 1995/3054)
 Social Security (Claims and Payments) Amendment Regulations 1995 (S.I. 1995/3055)
 Valuation Tribunals (Wales) Regulations 1995 (S.I. 1995/3056)
 Kensington and Chelsea and Hammersmith and Fulham (London Borough Boundaries) Order 1995 (S.I. 1995/3057)
 A102 Trunk Road (Blackwall Tunnel Approach, Greenwich) (Tunnel Avenue Slip Road) Order 1995 (S.I. 1995/3058)
 Beer (Amendment) Regulations 1995 (S.I. 1995/3059)
 Export of Goods (Control) (Amendment) Order 1995 (S.I. 1995/3060)
 Criminal Appeal Act 1995 (Commencement No. 1 and Transitional Provisions) Order 1995 (S.I. 1995/3061)
 Friendly Societies (Activities of a Subsidiary) Order 1995 (S.I. 1995/3062)
 Building Societies (Designation of Qualifying Bodies) (No. 2) Order 1995 (S.I. 1995/3063)
 Building Societies (Liquid Asset) (Amendment) (No. 2) Regulations 1995 (S.I. 1995/3064)
 Building Societies (Accounts and Related Provisions) (Amendment) Regulations 1995 (S.I. 1995/3065)
 Building Societies (Syndicated Lending) Order 1995 (S.I. 1995/3066)
 Occupational and Personal Pension Schemes (Miscellaneous Amendments) (No. 2) Regulations 1995 (S.I. 1995/3067)
 New Town (East Kilbride) (Transfer of Property, Rights and Liabilities) Order 1995 (S.I. 1995/3068)
 Act of Sederunt (Lands Valuation Appeal Court) 1995 (S.I. 1995/3069)
 Motorways Traffic (Scotland) Amendment Regulations 1995 (S.I. 1995/3070)
 National Health Service (Amendment) Act 1995 (Commencement No. 1 and Saving) Order 1995 (S.I. 1995/3090)
 National Health Service (Service Committees and Tribunal) Amendment Regulations 1995 (S.I. 1995/3091)
 National Health Service (General Dental Services) Amendment Regulations 1995 (S.I. 1995/3092)
 National Health Service (General Medical Services) Amendment (No. 2) Regulations 1995 (S.I. 1995/3093)
 Act of Sederunt (Fees of Messengers-at-Arms) 1995 (S.I. 1995/3094)
 Act of Sederunt (Fees of Sheriff Officers) 1995 (S.I. 1995/3095)
 Environmentally Sensitive Areas (Breadalbane) Designation (Amendment) Order 1995 (S.I. 1995/3096)
 Environmentally Sensitive Areas (Loch Lomond) Designation (Amendment) Order 1995 (S.I. 1995/3097)
 London Docklands Development Corporation (Alteration of Boundaries) Order 1995 (S.I. 1995/3098)
 Financial Assistance for Environmental Purposes (No. 4) Order 1995 (S.I. 1995/3099)
 A12 TRUNK ROAD (COLCHESTER ROAD, HAVERING) (PRESCRIBED ROUTES) ORDER 1995 (S.I. 1995/3100)

3101-3200

 Retirement Benefits Schemes (Information Powers) Regulations 1995 (S.I. 1995/3103)
 Pensions Act 1995 (Commencement No. 2) Order 1995 (S.I. 1995/3104)
 Local Government (Changes for the Registration Service in Avon, Cleveland, Humberside and North Yorkshire) Order 1995 (S.I. 1995/3105)
 Local Government (Registration Service in Wales) Order 1995 (S.I. 1995/3106)
 Traffic Signs (Amendment) Regulations and General Directions 1995 (S.I. 1995/3107)
 Local Government Act 1988 (Defined Activities) (Competition) (Supervision of Parking) (Amendment) (England) Regulations 1995 (S.I. 1995/3108)
 Mallaig Harbour Revision Order 1995 (S.I. 1995/3109)
 Special Educational Needs Tribunal Regulations 1995 (S.I. 1995/3113)
 Local Government Changes for England (Local Management of Schools) Regulations 1995 (S.I. 1995/3114)
 Spreadable Fats (Marketing Standards) Regulations 1995 (S.I. 1995/3116)
 Measuring Equipment (Liquid Fuel Delivered from Road Tankers) (Amendment) Regulations 1995 (S.I. 1995/3117)
 Local Government Act 1988 (Defined Activities) (Specified Periods) (England) (Amendment) Regulations 1995 (S.I. 1995/3118)
 War Pensions Committees (Amendment) Regulations 1995 (S.I. 1995/3119)
 Haddock (Specified Sea Areas) (Prohibition of Fishing) Order 1995 (S.I. 1995/3122)
 Sweeteners in Food Regulations 1995 (S.I. 1995/3123)
 Colours in Food Regulations 1995 (S.I. 1995/3124)
 Finance Act 1994, section 105, (Appointed Day) Order 1995 (S.I. 1995/3125)
 County Council of Clwyd (River Dee Estuary Bridge) (Variation) Scheme 1995 Confirmation Instrument 1995 (S.I. 1995/3126)
 Avon Fire Services (Combination Scheme) Order 1995 (S.I. 1995/3127)
 Merchant Shipping (Port State Control) Regulations 1995 (S.I. 1995/3128)
 Restrictive Trade Practices (Standards and Arrangements) (Goods) Order 1995 (S.I. 1995/3129)
 Restrictive Trade Practices (Standards and Arrangements) (Services) Order 1995 (S.I. 1995/3130)
 Cleveland Fire Services (Combination Scheme) Order 1995 (S.I. 1995/3131)
 Humberside Fire Services (Combination Scheme) Order 1995 (S.I. 1995/3132)
 North Yorkshire Fire Services (Combination Scheme) Order 1995 (S.I. 1995/3133)
 Insurance Companies (Pension Business) (Transitional Provisions) (Amendment) Regulations 1995 (S.I. 1995/3134)
 A4 Trunk Road (Hillingdon and Hounslow) Red Route Experimental Traffic Order 1995 (S.I. 1995/3138)
 A40 Trunk Road (Ealing) Red Route (Clearway) Traffic Order 1995 (S.I. 1995/3139)
 A40 Trunk Road (Ealing) Red Route Traffic Order 1995 (S.I. 1995/3140)
 A406 Trunk Road (Ealing) Red Route (Clearway) Traffic Order 1995 (S.I. 1995/3141)
 A406 Trunk Road (Brent) Red Route (Clearway) Traffic Order 1995 (S.I. 1995/3142)
 A406 Trunk Road (Brent) Red Route Experimental Traffic Order 1995 (S.I. 1995/3143)
 A406 Trunk Road (Brent) Red Route (Prescribed Route) Experimental Traffic Order 1995 (S.I. 1995/3144)
 Criminal Justice Act 1988 (Confiscation Orders) Order 1995 (S.I. 1995/3145)
 Air Quality Standards (Amendment) Regulations 1995 (S.I. 1995/3146)
 Value Added Tax (Amendment) Regulations 1995 (S.I. 1995/3147)
 Rent Officers (Additional Functions) (Amendment No. 2) Order 1995 (S.I. 1995/3148)
 Approval of Codes of Management Practice (Residential Property) (No. 2) Order 1995 (S.I. 1995/3149)
 Local Government Reorganisation (Wales) (Finance) (Miscellaneous Amendments and Transitional Provisions) Order 1995 (S.I. 1995/3150)
 Housing Benefit (Permitted Totals) Amendment Order 1995 (S.I. 1995/3151)
 Social Security (Unemployment, Sickness and Invalidity Benefit) Amendment (No. 2) Regulations 1995 (S.I. 1995/3152)
 Land Registration (No. 3) Rules 1995 (S.I. 1995/3153)
 Land Registration (Overriding Leases) Rules 1995 (S.I. 1995/3154)
 Water Byelaws (Loch an Sgoltaire) Extension Order 1995 (S.I. 1995/3155)
 Marriage (Prescription of Forms) (Scotland) Amendment Regulations 1995 (S.I. 1995/3156)
 Registration of Births, Still-births, Deaths and Marriages (Prescription of Forms) (Scotland) Amendment Regulations 1995 (S.I. 1995/3157)
 Adopted Children Register and Parental Order Register (Form of Entry) (Scotland) Regulations 1995 (S.I. 1995/3158)
 Hounslow (Various Roads) Traffic Order 1969 (Variation) Order 1995 (S.I. 1995/3159)
 Civil Aviation (Route Charges for Navigation Services) Regulations 1995 (S.I. 1995/3160)
 Civil Aviation (Joint Financing) (Amendment) Regulations 1995 (S.I. 1995/3161)
 Registration of Births, Deaths and Marriages (Fees) Order 1995 (S.I. 1995/3162)
 Reporting of Injuries, Diseases and Dangerous Occurrences Regulations 1995 (S.I. 1995/3163)
 A40 Trunk Road (Hillingdon) Red Route (Clearway) Traffic Order 1995 (S.I. 1995/3164)
 A41 Trunk Road (Watford Way/Hendon Way, Barnet) Temporary Prohibition of Traffic Order 1995 (S.I. 1995/3165)
 A41 Trunk Road (Baker Street) Red Route (Prohibited Turn) (No. 1) Experimental Traffic Order 1995 (S.I. 1995/3166)
 A41 Trunk Road (Westminster) Red Route (Bus Lane) Experimental Traffic Order 1995 (S.I. 1995/3167)
 A501 Trunk Road (Euston Road and Osnaburgh Street, Camden and Westminster) Red Route (Prescribed Route and Prohibited Turn No. 1) Experimental Traffic Order 1995 (S.I. 1995/3168)
 Civil Courts (Amendment) (No. 2) Order 1995 (S.I. 1995/3173)
 Medicines (Products Other Than Veterinary Drugs) (Prescription Only) Amendment (No. 2) Order 1995 (S.I. 1995/3174)
 Community Trade Mark (Fees) Regulations 1995 (S.I. 1995/3175)
 Fire Services (Notification of Establishment Schemes) (Scotland) Regulations 1995 (S.I. 1995/3176)
 Non-Domestic Rating Contributions (Scotland) Amendment Regulations 1995 (S.I. 1995/3177)
 Electromagnetic Compatibility (Amendment) Regulations 1995 (S.I. 1995/3180)
 Non-Domestic Rating Contributions (England) (Amendment) Regulations 1995 (S.I. 1995/3181)
 Sussex Ambulance Service National Health Service Trust (Transfer of Trust Property) Order 1995 (S.I. 1995/3182)
 Occupational Pension Schemes (Equal Treatment) Regulations 1995 (S.I. 1995/3183)
 Revenue Support Grant (Specified Bodies) (Amendment) Regulations 1995 (S.I. 1995/3184)
 Rent Officers (Additional Functions) (Scotland) Amendment (No.2) Order 1995 (S.I. 1995/3185)
 Agricultural Wages Committees (Areas) (England) Order 1995 (S.I. 1995/3186)
 Miscellaneous Food Additives Regulations 1995 (S.I. 1995/3187)
 Railtrack (Swinedyke Level Crossing) Order 1995 (S.I. 1995/3188)
 Fresh Meat (Hygiene and Inspection) (Amendment) Regulations 1995 (S.I. 1995/3189)
 Retirement Age of General Commissioners Order 1995 (S.I. 1995/3192)
 Medicines (Veterinary Drugs) (Pharmacy and Merchants' List) (Amendment) Order 1995 (S.I. 1995/3193)
 Local Government (Wales) Act 1994 (Commencement No. 6) Order 1995 (S.I. 1995/3198)
 National Health Service (General Medical Services) (Scotland) Amendment Regulations 1995 (S.I. 1995/3199)
 National Health Service (General Dental Services) (Scotland) Amendment Regulations 1995 (S.I. 1995/3200)

3201-3300

 National Health Service (Service Committees and Tribunal) (Scotland) Amendment Regulations 1995 (S.I. 1995/3201)
 Bread and Flour Regulations 1995 (S.I. 1995/3202)
 City of Sunderland College (Incorporation) Order 1995 (S.I. 1995/3203)
 City of Sunderland College (Government) Regulations 1995 (S.I. 1995/3204)
 Minced Meat and Meat Preparations (Hygiene) Regulations 1995 (S.I. 1995/3205)
 European Communities (Designation) (No. 4) Order 1995 (S.I. 1995/3207)
 European Specialist Medical Qualifications Order 1995 (S.I. 1995/3208)
 Extradition (Torture) (Bermuda) Order 1995 (S.I. 1995/3209)
 Street Works (Northern Ireland) Order 1995 (S.I. 1995/3210)
 Polygamous Marriages (Northern Ireland) Order 1995 (S.I. 1995/3211)
 Agriculture (Conservation Grants) (Northern Ireland) Order 1995 (S.I. 1995/3212)
 Pensions (Northern Ireland) Order 1995 (S.I. 1995/3213)
 National Health Service (Amendment) Act 1995 (Commencement No.2 and Saving) (Scotland) Order 1995 (S.I. 1995/3214)
 Medicines (Sale or Supply) (Miscellaneous Provisions) Amendment Regulations 1995 (S.I. 1995/3215)
 Medicines (Products Other Than Veterinary Drugs) (General Sale List) Amendment Order 1995 (S.I. 1995/3216)
 Police and Criminal Evidence Act 1984 (Application to Customs and Excise) (Amendment ) Order 1995 (S.I. 1995/3217)
 North Wales Fire Services (Combination Scheme) Order 1995 (S.I. 1995/3218)
 Income Tax (Stock Lending) (Amendment No. 2) Regulations 1995 (S.I. 1995/3219)
 Sale and Repurchase of Securities (Modification of Enactments) Regulations 1995 (S.I. 1995/3220)
 Income Tax (Manufactured Interest) (Amendment) Regulations 1995 (S.I. 1995/3221)
 Value Added Tax (Imported Goods) Relief (Amendment) Order 1995 (S.I. 1995/3222)
 Deregulation (Building Societies) Order 1995 (S.I. 1995/3223)
 Gilt-edged Securities (PeriodicAccounting for Tax on Interest) Regulations 1995 (S.I. 1995/3224)
 Lloyd's Underwriters (Gilt-edged Securities) (Periodic Accounting for Tax on Interest) Regulations 1995 (S.I. 1995/3225)
 Jobseekers Act 1995 (Commencement No. 1) Order 1995 (S.I. 1995/3228)
 Mid and West Wales Fire Services (Combination Scheme) Order 1995 (S.I. 1995/3229)
 South Wales Fire Services (Combination Scheme) Order 1995 (S.I. 1995/3230)
 Deregulation (Greyhound Racing) Order 1995 (S.I. 1995/3231)
 Dog Racecourse Totalisator Regulations 1995 (S.I. 1995/3232)
 Deregulation (Building Societies) Order 1995 (S.I. 1995/3233)
 Health and Safety (Repeals and Revocations) Regulations 1995 (S.I. 1995/3234)
 Non-Domestic Rating Contributions (Wales) (Amendment) Regulations 1995 (S.I. 1995/3235)
 Finance Act 1995, section 63 (2), (Appointed Day) Order 1995 (S.I. 1995/3236)
 Insurance Companies (Overseas Life Assurance Business) (Compliance) Regulations 1995 (S.I. 1995/3237)
 Insurance Companies (Overseas Life Assurance Business) (Tax Credit) Regulations 1995 (S.I. 1995/3238)
 Tax-exempt Special Savings Account (Relevant European Institutions) Regulations 1995 (S.I. 1995/3239)
 Cheese and Cream Regulations 1995 (S.I. 1995/3240)
 Cycle Racing on Highways (Amendment) Regulations 1995 (S.I. 1995/3241)
 Church Representation Rules (Amendment) Resolution 1995 (S.I. 1995/3243)
 Misuse of Drugs (Amendment) (No. 2) Regulations 1995 (S.I. 1995/3244)
 Saithe (Specified Sea Areas) (Prohibition of Fishing) Order 1995 (S.I. 1995/3245)
 Specified Bovine Offal (Amendment) Order 1995 (S.I. 1995/3246)
 Environmental Protection (Prescribed Processes and Substances) (Amendment) Regulations 1995 (S.I. 1995/3247)
 Insurance Companies (Amendment) Regulations 1995 (S.I. 1995/3248)
 Export of Goods (Control) (Amendment No. 2) Order 1995 (S.I. 1995/3249)
 Water Undertakings (Rateable Values) (Scotland) (No.2) Order 1995 (S.I. 1995/3252)
 Docks and Harbours (Rateable Values) (Scotland) Amendment (No.2) Order 1995 (S.I. 1995/3253)
 Severn Bridges Tolls Order 1995 (S.I. 1995/3254)
 Hinchingbrooke Health Care National Health Service Trust (Transfer of Trust Property) Order 1995 (S.I. 1995/3256)
 Kent and Sussex Weald National Health Service Trust (Transfer of Trust Property) Order 1995 (S.I. 1995/3257)
 Mid Kent Healthcare National Health Service Trust (Transfer of Trust Property) Order 1995 (S.I. 1995/3258)
 Weald of Kent Community National Health Service Trust (Transfer of Trust Property) Order 1995 (S.I. 1995/3259)
 Queen Victoria Hospital National Health Service Trust (Transfer of Trust Property) Order 1995 (S.I. 1995/3260)
 Child Support (Miscellaneous Amendments) (No. 2) Regulations 1995 (S.I. 1995/3261)
 Child Support Act 1995 (Commencement No. 2) Order 1995 (S.I. 1995/3262)
 Child Support (Compensation for Recipients of Family Credit and Disability Working Allowance) Regulations 1995 (S.I. 1995/3263)
 Local Government Changes (Rent Act Registration Areas) Order 1995 (S.I. 1995/3264)
 Child Support (Miscellaneous Amendments) (No. 3) Regulations 1995 (S.I. 1995/3265)
 City of Manchester (Mancunian Way A635(M) and A57(M) Mancunian Way Slip Roads) Special Road Scheme 1992 Confirmation Instrument 1995 (S.I. 1995/3266)
 Food (Miscellaneous Revocations and Amendments) Regulations 1995 (S.I. 1995/3267)
 Bristol Development Corporation (Area and Constitution) Order 1995 (S.I. 1995/3269)
 M27 South Coast Motorway (Ower—Chilworth Section) Connecting Roads Scheme 1970 Variation Scheme (No 2) 1995 (S.I. 1995/3270)
 Financial Services Act 1986 (Investment Services) (Extension of Scope of Act) Order 1995 (S.I. 1995/3271)
 Uncertificated Securities Regulations 1995 (S.I. 1995/3272)
 Financial Services Act 1986 (EEA Regulated Markets) (Exemption) Order 1995 (S.I. 1995/3273)
 Vocational Training (Public Financial Assistance and Disentitlement to Tax Relief) (Amendment) Regulations 1995 (S.I. 1995/3274)
 Investment Services Regulations 1995 (S.I. 1995/3275)
 Jobseeker's Allowance (Transitional Provisions) Regulations 1995 (S.I. 1995/3276)
 County Court (Amendment No. 4) Rules 1995 (S.I. 1995/3277)
 County Court (Forms) (Amendment No. 4) Rules 1995 (S.I. 1995/3278)
 National Health Service (Fund-holding Practices) (Functions of Family Health Services Authorities) Regulations 1995 (S.I. 1995/3280)
 Attendance Centre Rules 1995 (S.I. 1995/3281)
 Income-related Benefits Schemes (Widows' etc. Pensions Disregards) Amendment Regulations 1995 (S.I. 1995/3282)
 Combined Probation Areas (Oxfordshire and Buckinghamshire) Order 1995 (S.I. 1995/3283)
 Combined Probation Areas (Greater Manchester) (No. 2) Order 1995 (S.I. 1995/3284)
 Sandwell Healthcare National Health Service Trust (Transfer of Trust Property) Order 1995 (S.I. 1995/3285)
 Personal Equity Plan (Amendment No. 2) Regulations 1995 (S.I. 1995/3287)
 Cod and Whiting (Specified Sea Areas) (Prohibition of Fishing) Order 1995 (S.I. 1995/3293)
 Local Government (Superannuation and Compensation for Redundancy or Premature Retirement) (Scotland) Amendment Regulations 1995 (S.I. 1995/3294)
 Rural Diversification Programme (Scotland) Regulations 1995 (S.I. 1995/3295)
 Duration of Copyright and Rights in Performances Regulations 1995 (S.I. 1995/3297)
 Dual-Use and Related Goods (Export Control) (Amendment No. 2) Regulations 1995 (S.I. 1995/3298)
 Electrical Contracting (London Exhibition Halls) Order 1995 (S.I. 1995/3299)

3301-3400

 Local Government Act 1988 (Competition) (Legal and Construction etc. Services) (Police Authorities) Regulations 1995 (S.I. 1995/3302)
 Local Government Act 1988 (Defined Activities) (Exemptions) (Police Authorities) Order 1995 (S.I. 1995/3303)
 Local Authorities (Expenditure Powers) Order 1995 (S.I. 1995/3304)
 Rules of the Supreme Court (Amendment No. 3) 1995 (S.I. 1995/3316)
 Income Support (General) Amendment Regulations 1995 (S.I. 1995/3320)
 Education (Mandatory Awards) Regulations 1995 (S.I. 1995/3321)
 Non-Domestic Rating (Chargeable Amounts) (Amendment No. 3) Regulations 1995 (S.I. 1995/3322)
 Bristol Development Corporation (Dissolution) Order 1995 (S.I. 1995/3323)
 Olympics Association Right (Infringement Proceedings) Regulations 1995 (S.I. 1995/3325)
 Local Government etc. (Scotland) Act 1994 (Commencement No.6 and Saving) Order 1995 (S.I. 1995/3326)
 Roads (Transitional Powers) (Scotland) Amendment Order 1995 (S.I. 1995/3328)
 Sole (Specified Sea Areas) (Prohibition of Fishing) Order 1995 (S.I. 1995/3329)
 Disability Discrimination Act 1995 (Commencement No. 1) Order 1995 (S.I. 1995/3330)
 Town and Country Planning (General Development Procedure) (Welsh Forms) Order 1995 (S.I. 1995/3336)
 Home Energy Conservation Act 1995 (Commencement No. 2) (England) Order 1995 (S.I. 1995/3340)
 Motor Vehicles (Designation of Approval Marks) (Amendment) Regulations 1995 (S.I. 1995/3342)
 Act of Sederunt (Reciprocal Enforcement of Maintenance Orders) (United States of America) 1995 (S.I. 1995/3345)

External links
Legislation.gov.uk delivered by the UK National Archive
UK SI's on legislation.gov.uk
UK Draft SI's on legislation.gov.uk

See also
List of Statutory Instruments of the United Kingdom

Lists of Statutory Instruments of the United Kingdom
Statutory Instruments